= Bird park =

Bird park may refer to:

- Aviary, an enclosure for containing birds
- Bird park, a zoo for birds
- Bali Bird Park, Bali, Indonesia
- Fonghuanggu Bird and Ecology Park, Nantou, Taiwan
- Francis William Bird Park, Massachusetts, United States
- Jurong Bird Park, Singapore - the largest in terms of bird numbers
- Kuala Lumpur Bird Park, Kuala Lumpur, Malaysia
- Melaka Bird Park, Malacca, Malaysia
- Tokyo Port Wild Bird Park, Japan
- Walsrode Bird Park, Lower Saxony, Germany - the largest in terms of area
- Bird Park (Mt. Lebanon, Pennsylvania) - a municipal park in Mt. Lebanon, PA

== See also ==
- Parc des Oiseaux (English: Park of Birds), a zoological park in Villars-les-Dombes, Ain, France
