= Tamagawadai Park =

Park in Tokyo, Japan

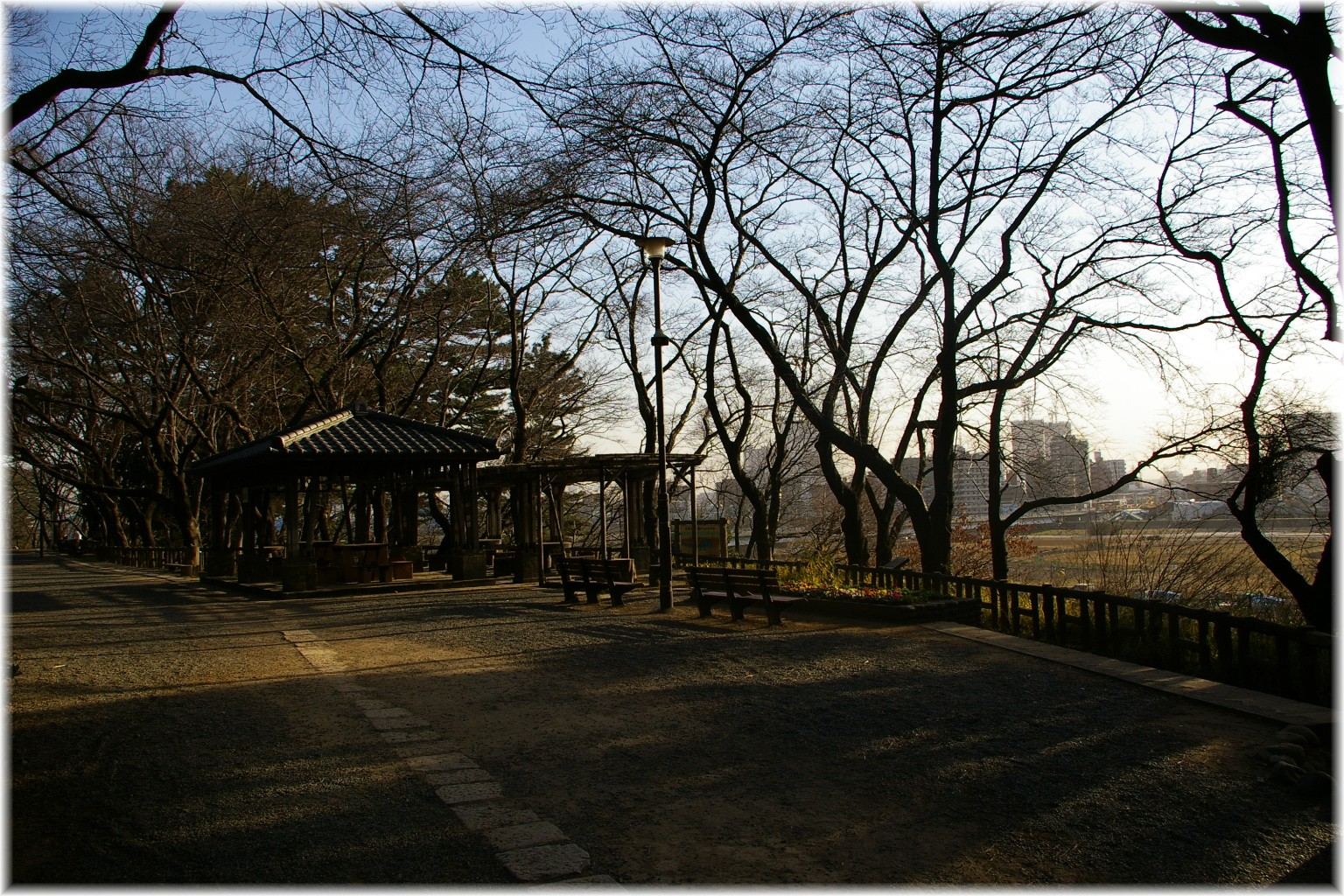
- The park in autumn
- Interactive map of Tamagawadai Park
- Location: 1-63-1 Den-en-chōfu, Ōta Ward, Tokyo, Japan
- Coordinates: 35°35′24″N 139°39′57″E
- Public transit: Tamagawa Station

Tamagawadai Park (多摩川台公園, Tamagawadai Kōen) is a public park located in Ota ward, Tokyo, Japan. It contains two ancient kofun burial mounds. It contains a number of cherry blossom trees .It is also well known for its large number of hydrangea trees.
