= Nagahara Station =

Nagahara Station may refer to:

- Nagahara Station (Tokyo) - (長原駅) A railway station in Tokyo, Japan, on the Tokyu Ikegami Line
- Nagahara Station (Shiga) - (永原駅) A railway station in Shiga Prefecture, Japan, on the Kosei Line
- Nagahara Station (Osaka) - (長原駅) A railway station in Hirano-ku, Osaka, Osaka Prefecture, Japan, on the Osaka Municipal Subway Tanimachi Line
