= Akimasa =

- Gender: Male

Origin
- Origin: Japanese
- Meaning: Different meanings depending on the kanji used

Akimasa (written: 晶雅, 彰正, 顕正, 明正, etc.) is a masculine Japanese given name. Notable people with the name include:

- Akimasa Nakamura (中村 彰正; born 1961), Japanese astronomer
- Akimasa Tsukamoto (塚本 明正; born 1969), Japanese footballer
- Yoshikawa Akimasa (芳川 顕正; 1842–1920), Japanese samurai and politician
- Akimasa Suzuki (鈴木 晶雅; born 1958), Japanese politician
