= Omori Nori Museum =

Seaweed museum in Tokyo, Japan

- 大森 海苔のふるさと館
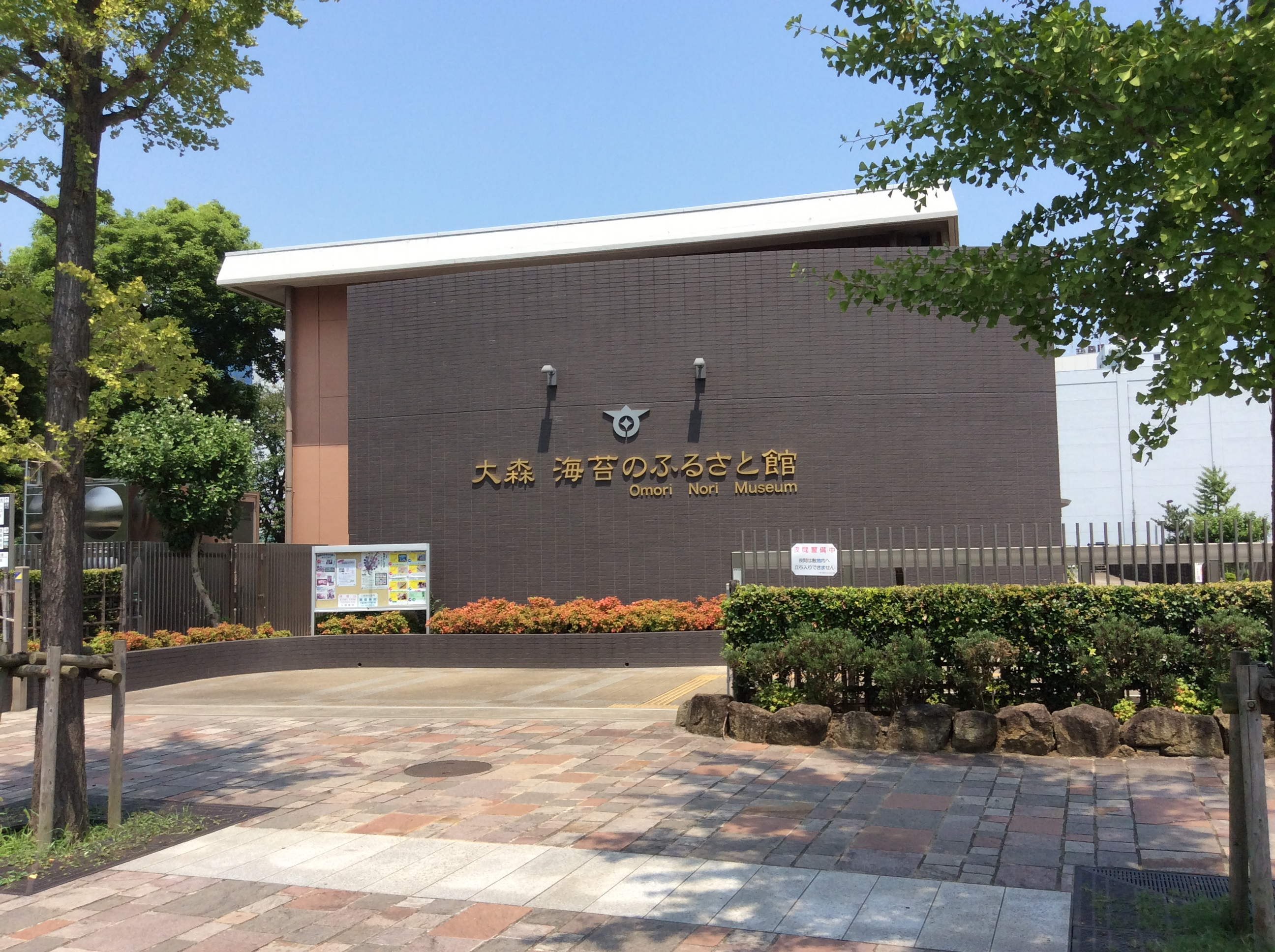
- Interactive map of the Omori Nori Museum area

General information
- Location: 2-2 Heiwanomorikoen, Ōmori, Ōta, Tokyo, Japan
- Coordinates: 35°34′38″N 139°44′34″E
- Opened: 2008

Website
- Official website

The Omori Nori Museum (Japanese: 大森 海苔のふるさと館) is a museum dedicated to the history, culture and creation process of nori, a type of edible Japanese seaweed.

== History ==
The museum opened in 2008, is located in the Ōmori district, in the ward of Ōta, Tokyo. It is a short walk from Ōmori Furusato-no-Hamabe Park. It also hosts a research project where volunteers grow nori traditionally in the nearby park. Visitors can explore Ōmori's seaweed heritage through exhibits of nori-making tools, boats, and a hands-on nori-making class.

== Areas and exhibits ==
The building has three floors. The first floor offers exhibits about the creation process of nori, with a reproduced working place of a nori producer. The first floor also includes the last nori boat with an engine. On the second floor, one can find exhibits about the tools used to create nori traditionally. There is also an experience centre located on the second floor, allowing people to create their own nori sheets. A rest area is available on the third floor, offering a view of the seaside scenery of the Ōmori Furusato-no-Hamabe Park.
