= Senzoku-ike Station =

Railway station in Tokyo, Japan

Coordinates: 35°36′00″N 139°41′27″E

Senzoku-ike Station 洗足池駅

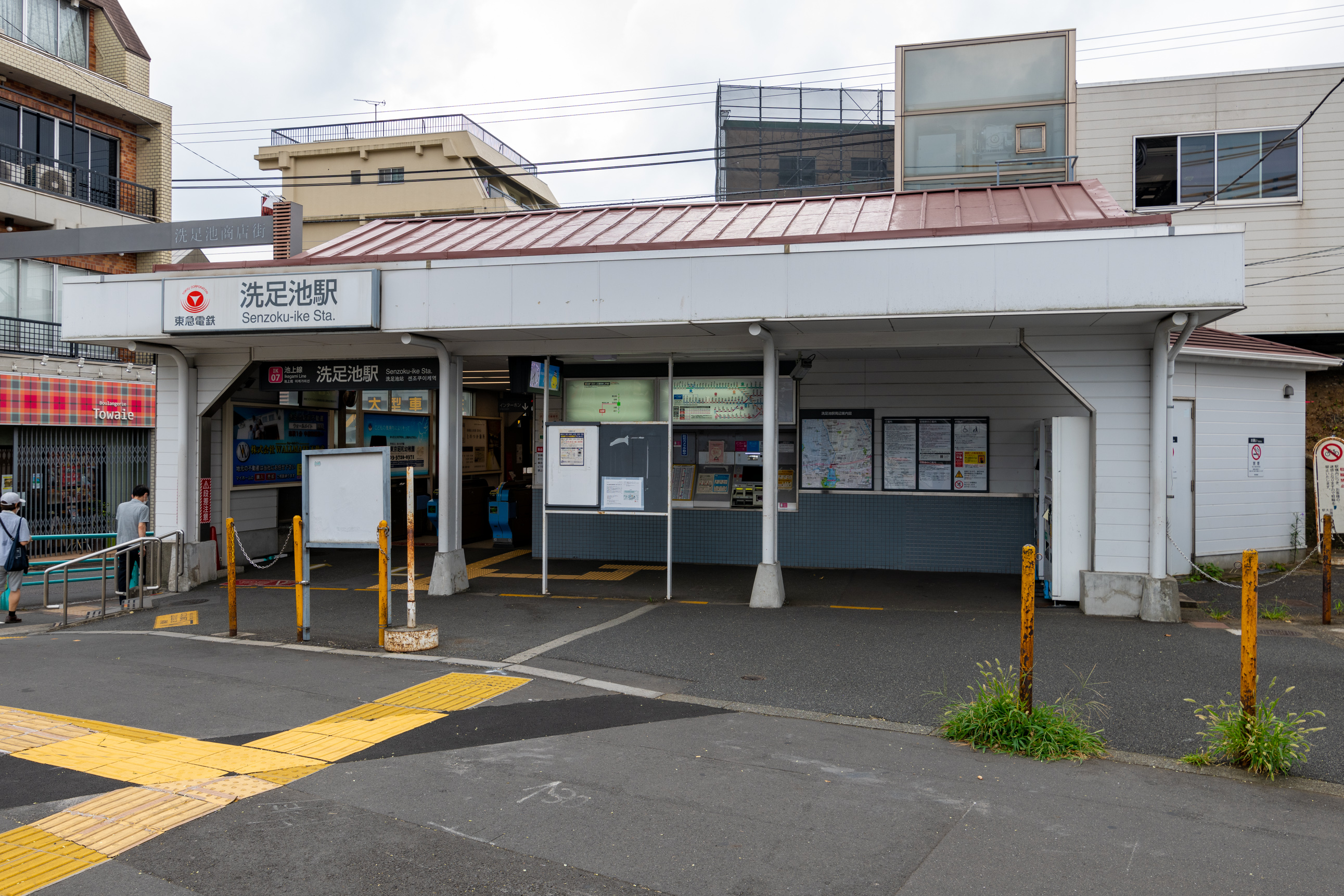

General information
- Location: Higashi-Yukigaya, Ota, Tokyo （東京都大田区東雪谷） Japan
- Operator: Tōkyū Railways
- Line: Ikegami Line
- Platforms: 2 side platforms
- Tracks: 2
- Connections: Bus stop

Construction
- Structure type: Elevated

Other information
- Station code: IK07

History
- Opened: 28 August 1927; 99 years ago

Services
Preceding station	Tōkyū Railways	Following station
Ishikawadai towards Kamata	Ikegami Line	Nagahara towards Gotanda
Location
- Location within Special wards of Tokyo Location within Tokyo Bay and Bōsō Peninsula Location within Tokyo Location within Japan

Senzoku-ike Station (洗足池駅, Senzoku-ike-eki) is a station located in southeast Tokyo. It is named for the nearby Senzoku pond.

== Station layout ==
Two elevated side platforms.

1	■ Ikegami Line	Yukigaya-Ōtsuka ・ Ikegami ・ Kamata
2	■ Ikegami Line	Hatanodai ・ Togoshi-Ginza ・ Gotanda

== History ==
- August 1927 Opened as a station of Ikegami Electric Railway.
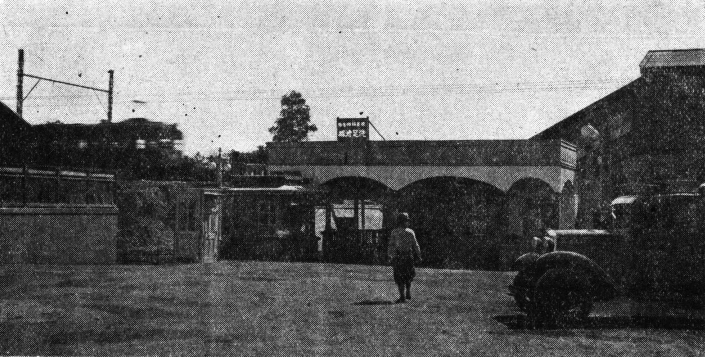
The station in the 1940.

== Bus services ==
- Senzoku-ike (洗足池) bus stop
  - Tokyu Bus
    - <森05>Omori Garage - Ōmori Sta. - Ikegami Garage - Ikegami Sta. mae - Ebara Hospital mae - Senzoku-ike
