= Den Enchofu High School =

Coordinates: 35.5822°N 139.6767°E

- Japanese: 東京都立田園調布高等学校
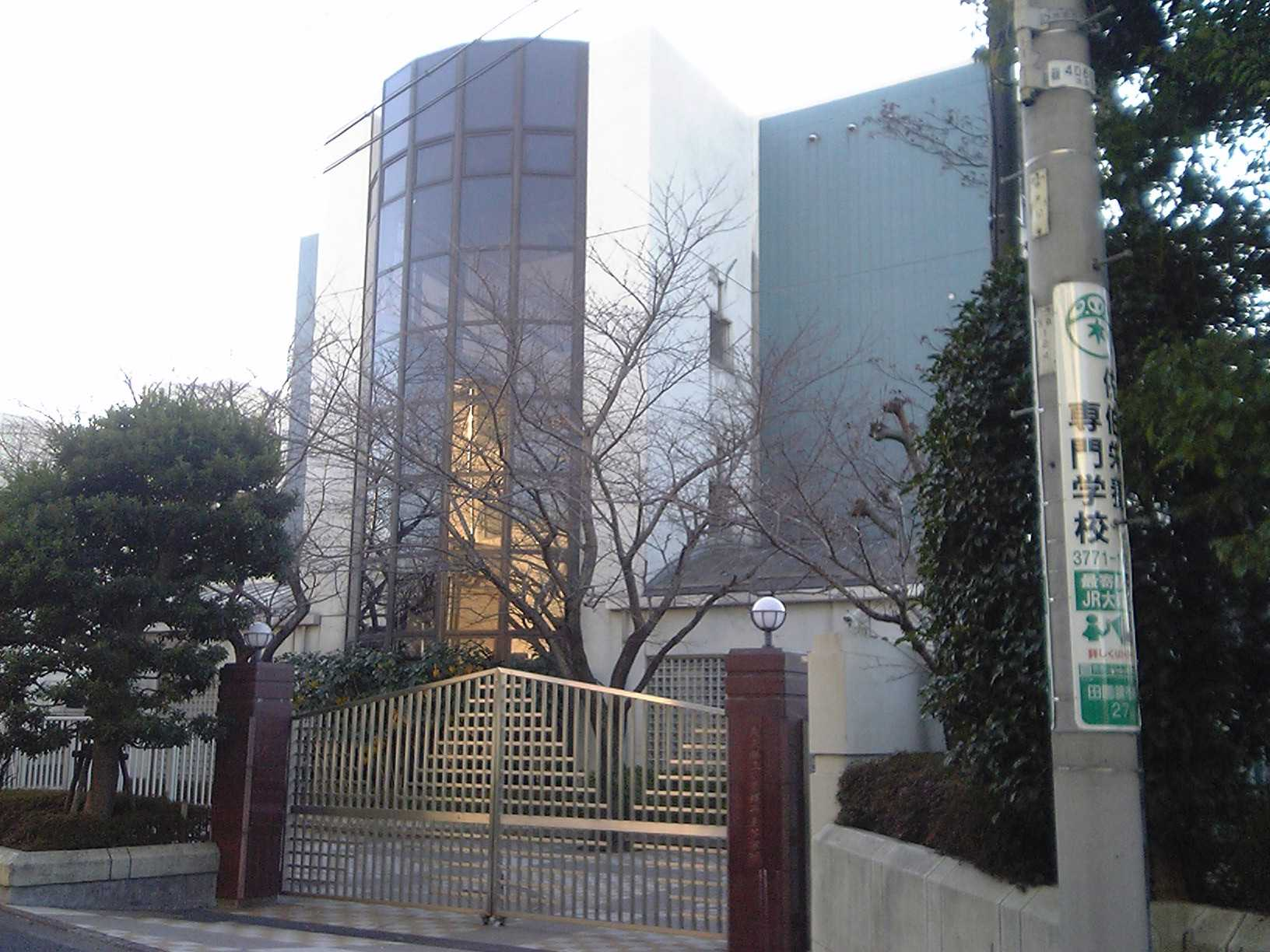
- Den-en-chōfu, Ōta, Tokyo; Japan

Tokyo Metropolitan Den Enchofu High School (東京都立田園調布高等学校, Tōkyō-toritsu Den Enchōfu Kōtōgakkō) is a senior high school operated by the Tokyo Metropolitan Board of Education, located in Den Enchōfu Minami, Ōta, Tokyo.

== See also ==
- List of high schools in Tokyo
