= 2007 Ōta local election =

Local election in Japan

Ōta, Tokyo held a local election for the city assembly on April 22, 2007.

== Results ==
Summary of the April 22, 2007 Ōta City Assembly election results
| Parties | Votes | % | Seats |
|---|---|---|---|
| Liberal Democratic Party (自由民主党, Jiyū Minshutō) | 66,477.592 | | 19 |
| New Komeito Party (公明党, Kōmeitō) | 50,564.935 | | 12 |
| Japanese Communist Party (日本共産党, Nihon Kyōsan-tō) | 30,689.759 | | 7 |
| Democratic Party of Japan (民主党, Minshutō) | 45,379.179 | | 6 |
| 生活者ﾈｯﾄﾜｰｸ | 5,704 | | 1 |
| 緑の党 | 4,642 | | 1 |
| Social Democratic Party (社民党 Shamin-tō) | 2,960 | | 1 |
| Liberal Party | 2,880 | | 1 |
| Independents | 4,783 | | 1 |
| Total (turnout 45.57%) | N/A | 100.00 | 50 |
