= Chidorichō Station =

Railway station in Tokyo, Japan

Coordinates: 35°34′23″N 139°41′29″E

Chidorichō Station 千鳥町駅

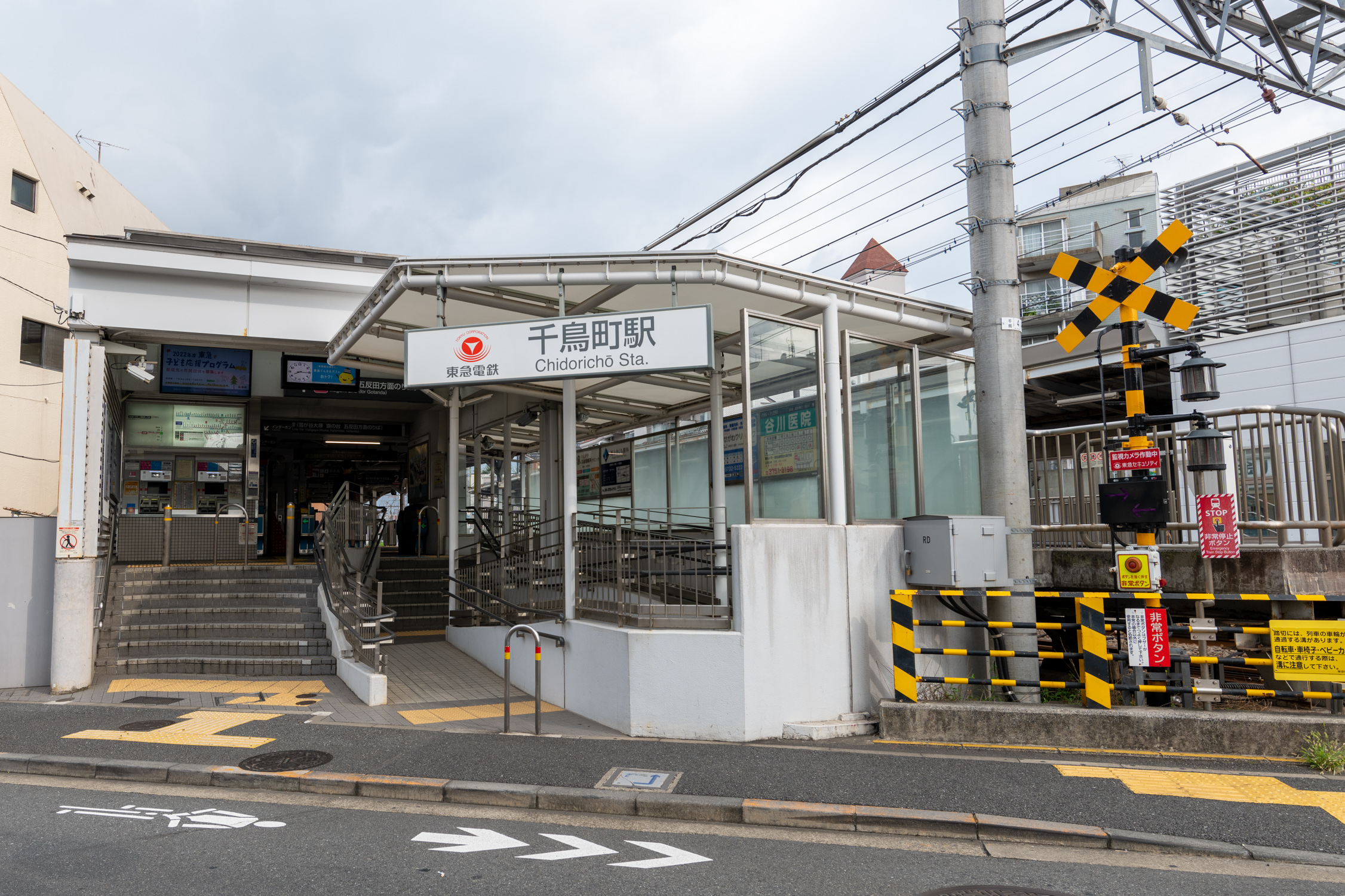
- Station building, August 2021

General information
- Location: 1-20-1 Chidori, Ōta Ward, Tokyo; Japan
- Operator: Tōkyū Railways
- Line: Ikegami Line
- Platforms: 2 side platforms
- Tracks: 2

Construction
- Structure type: At grade

Other information
- Station code: IK12

History
- Opened: August 6, 1926; 100 years ago
- Former names: Keidai Ground-mae (until 1936)

Services
Preceding station	Tōkyū Railways	Following station
Ikegami towards Kamata	Ikegami Line	Kugahara towards Gotanda
Location
- Location within Special wards of Tokyo Location within Tokyo Bay and Bōsō Peninsula Location within Tokyo Location within Japan

Chidorichō Station (千鳥町駅, Chidorichō eki) is a Tokyo Kyuko Electric Railway Ikegami Line station located in Ōta, Tokyo.

== Station layout ==
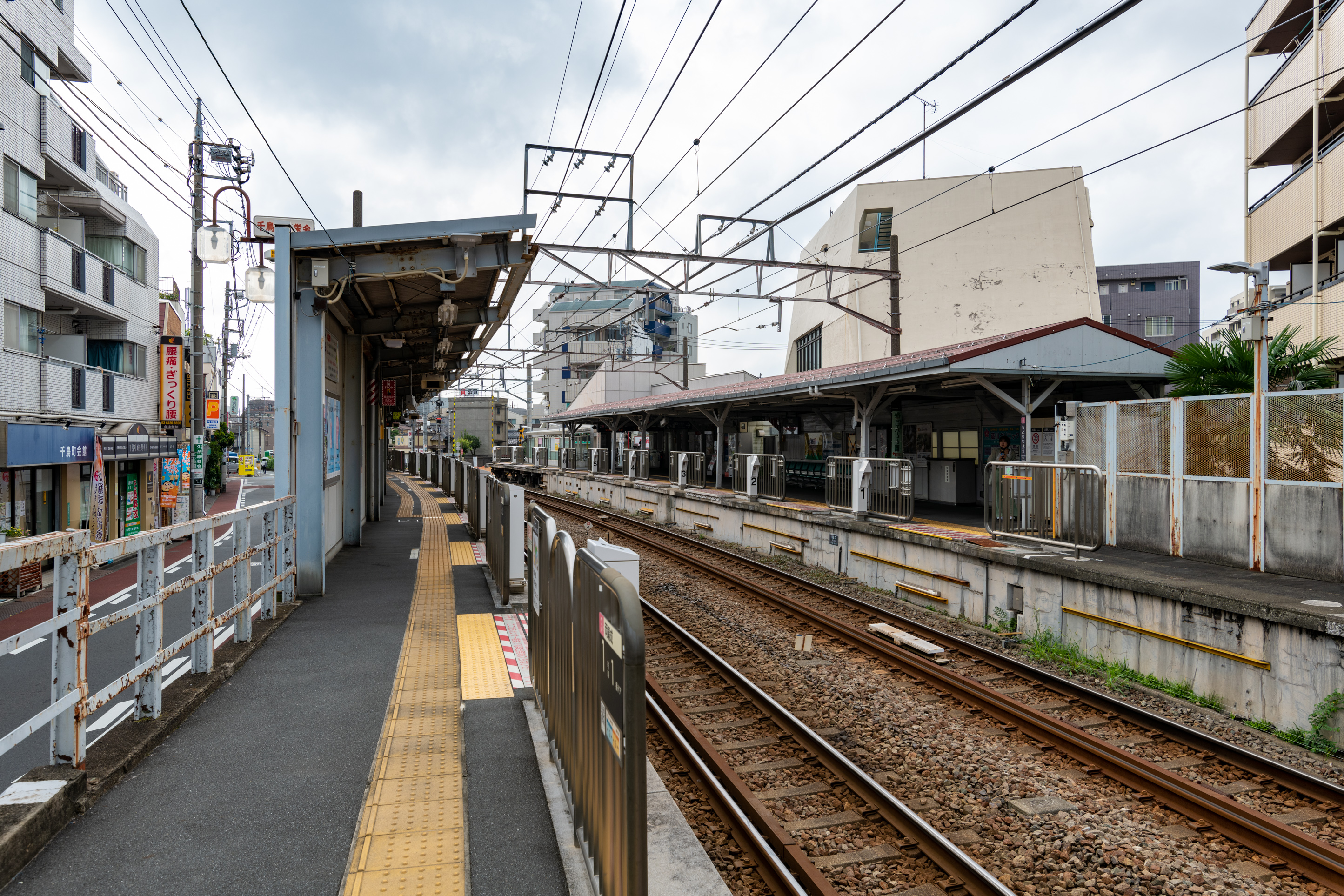
Platform, August 2021

Chidorichō Station has two ground-level side platforms.

1	■ Ikegami Line	Ikegami, Kamata
2	■ Ikegami Line	Hatanodai, Gotanda

== History ==
On August 6, 1926, the station opened as Keidai Ground-mae Station (慶大グラウンド前駅) of Ikegami Electric Railway. It was renamed to the present name on January 1, 1936.

In 2025, Tokyu Corporation announced its plans to carry out a "wood-themed" renovation for Chidorichō Station. The work will include rebuilt platform roofing, an updated station building, and new passenger restrooms. Construction is scheduled to be completed in the final quarter of 2026.
