= Ishikawa-dai Station =

Railway station in Tokyo, Japan

Coordinates: 35°35′49″N 139°41′06″E

Ishikawa-dai Station 石川台駅

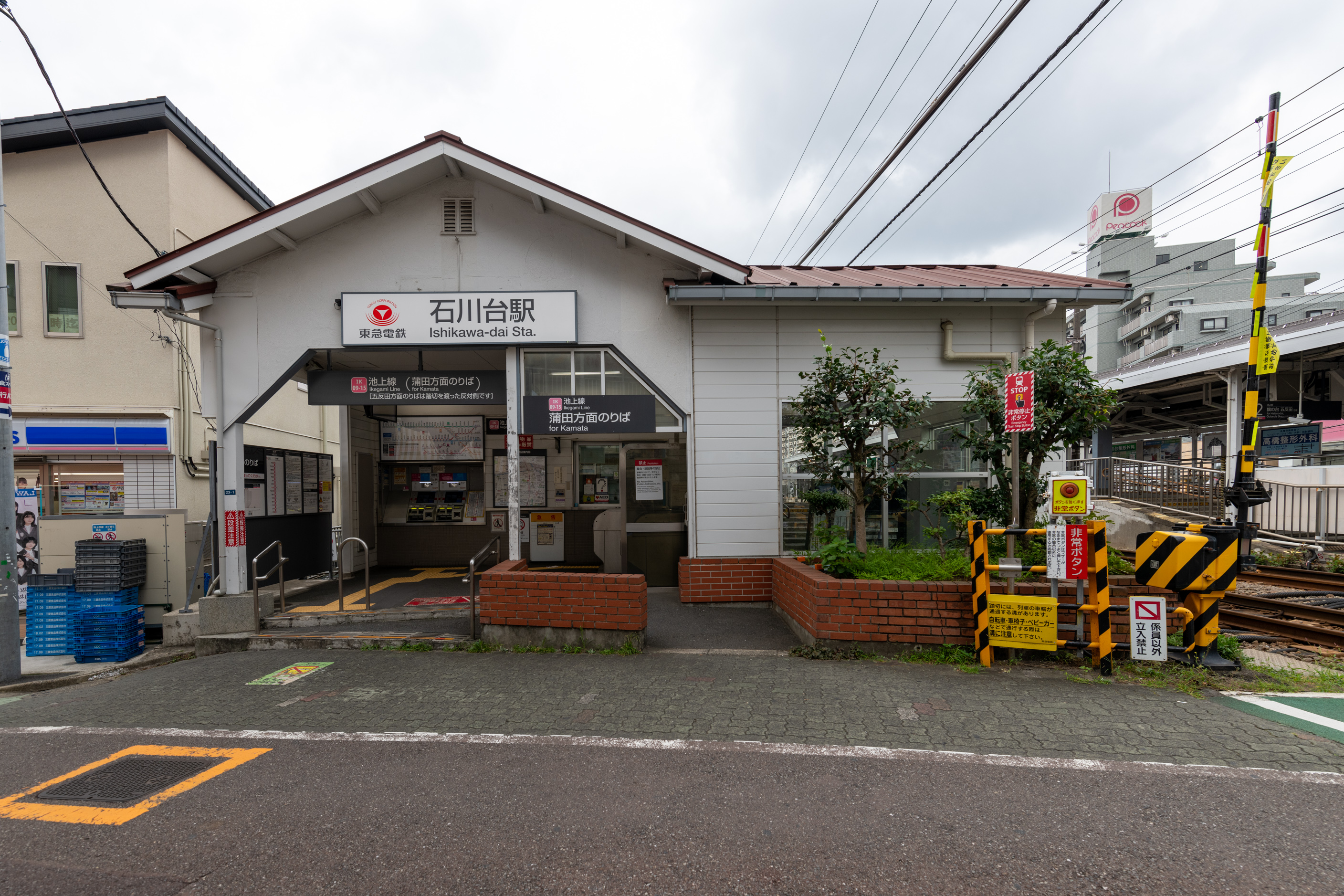
- Ishikawa-dai Station, August 2021

General information
- Location: Higashi-Yukigaya, Ota Ward, Tokyo （東京都大田区東雪谷） Japan
- Operator: Tōkyū Railways
- Line: Ikegami Line
- Platforms: 2 side platforms
- Tracks: 2
- Connections

Construction
- Structure type: At grade

Other information
- Station code: IK08

History
- Opened: 28 August 1927; 99 years ago
- Former names: Ishikawa (until 1928)

Services
| Preceding station | Tōkyū Railways | Following station |
|---|---|---|
| Yukigaya-ōtsuka towards Kamata | Ikegami Line | Senzoku-ike towards Gotanda |
Location
- Location within Special wards of Tokyo Location within Tokyo Bay and Bōsō Peninsula Location within Tokyo Location within Japan

Ishikawa-dai Station (石川台駅, Ishikawa-dai-eki) is a railway station on the Tokyu Ikegami Line in Ota, Tokyo, Japan, operated by Tokyu Corporation.

== Lines ==
Ishikawa-dai Station is served by the Tokyu Ikegami Line, and is located 4.9 km from the line's Tokyo terminus at Gotanda.

== Station layout ==
The station consists of two side platforms serving two tracks. The train tracks go over the street which pedestrians may need to cross to get to the platform. Hence, crossing between platforms as the train arrives is not possible.

=== Platforms ===
| 1 | ■ Tokyu Ikegami Line | for Yukigaya-ōtsuka, Ikegami, and Kamata |
| 2 | ■ Tokyu Ikegami Line | for Hatanodai, Togoshi-Ginza, and Gotanda |

== History ==
The station first opened on 28 August 1927 as Ishikawa Station (石川駅). On 3 April 1928, it was renamed Ishikawa-dai.

== Surrounding area ==
- Tokyo Institute of Technology
