= Ōta, Tokyo =

Ōta 大田区
- Special ward
- Ōta City
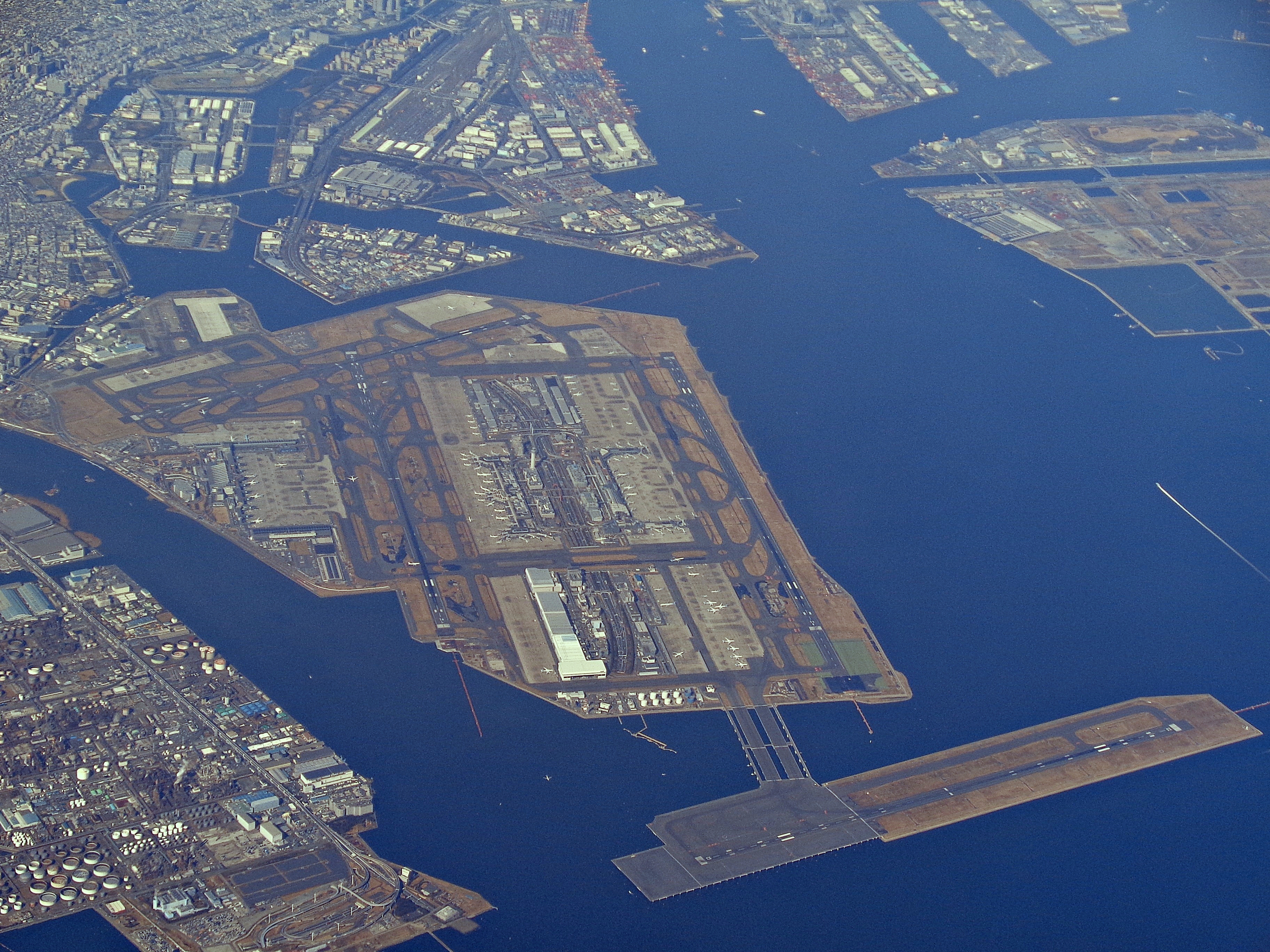
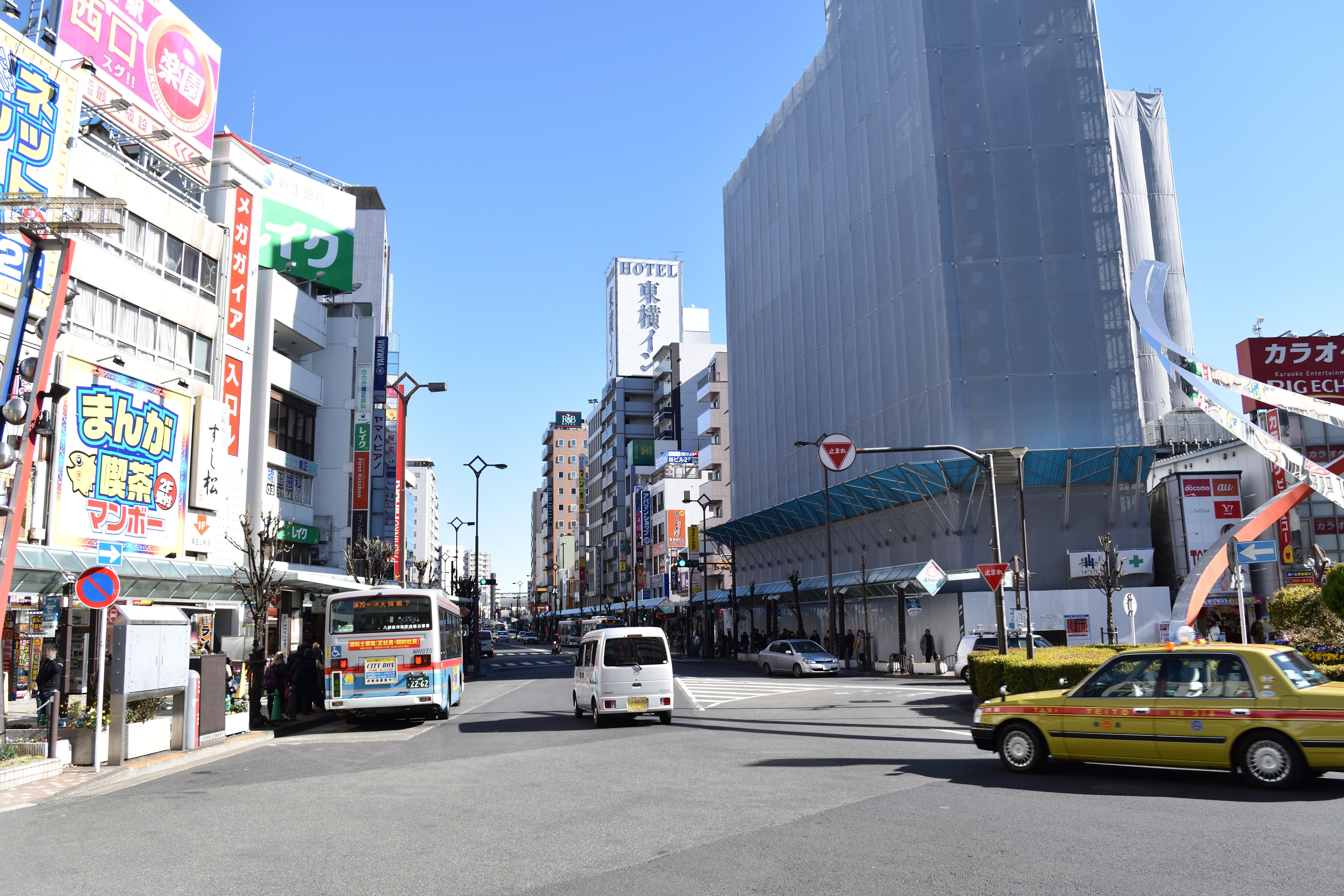
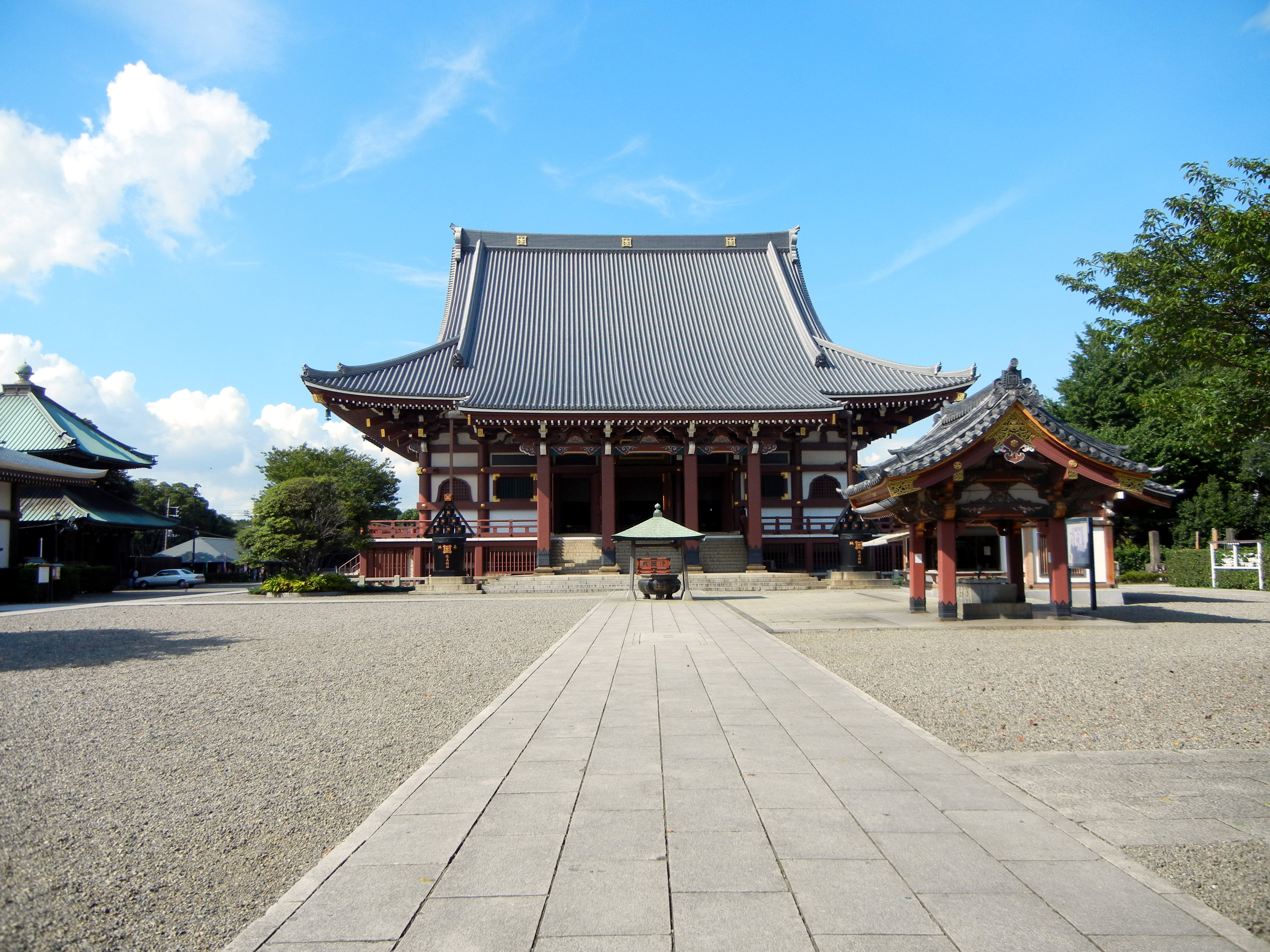
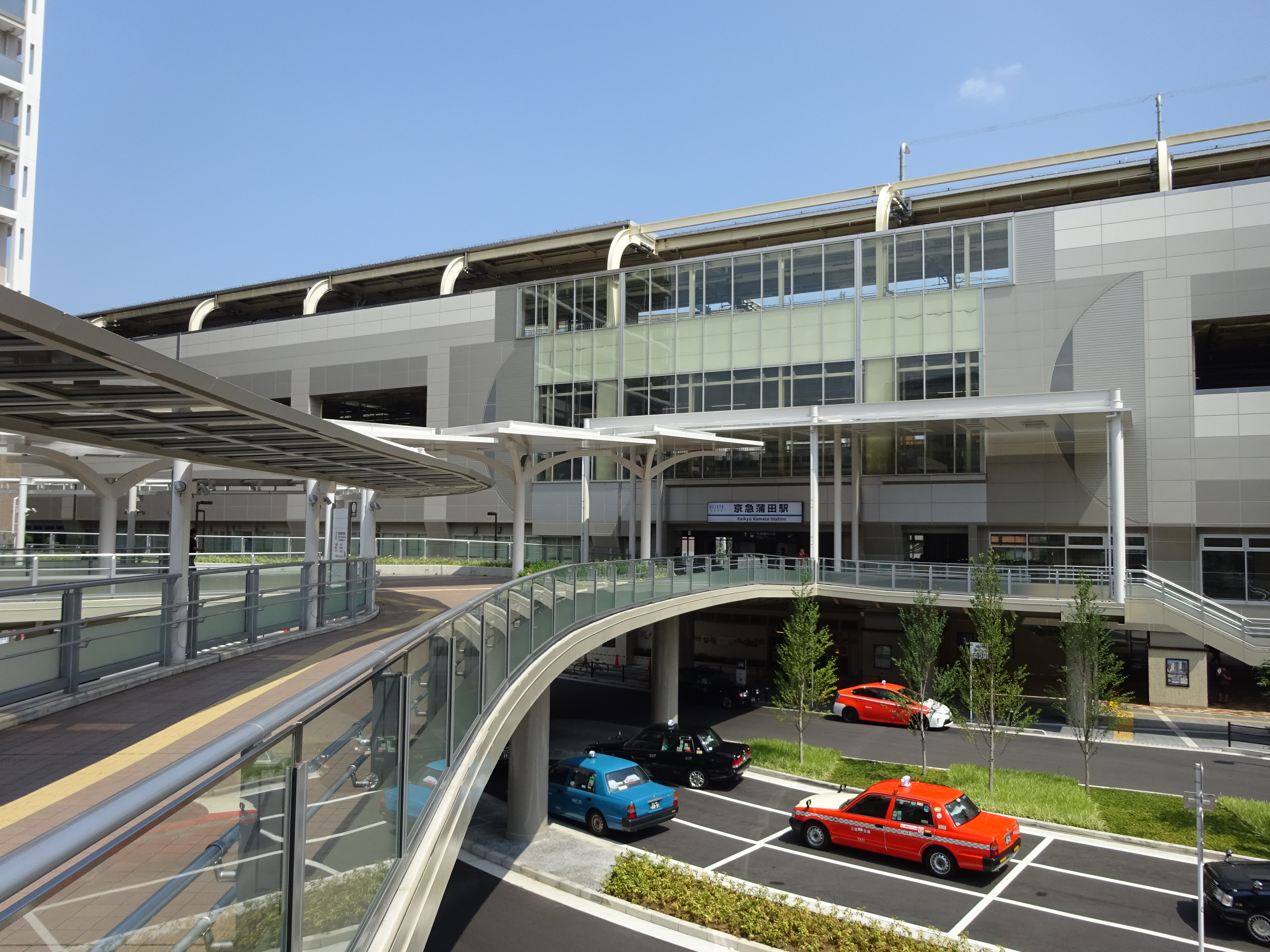
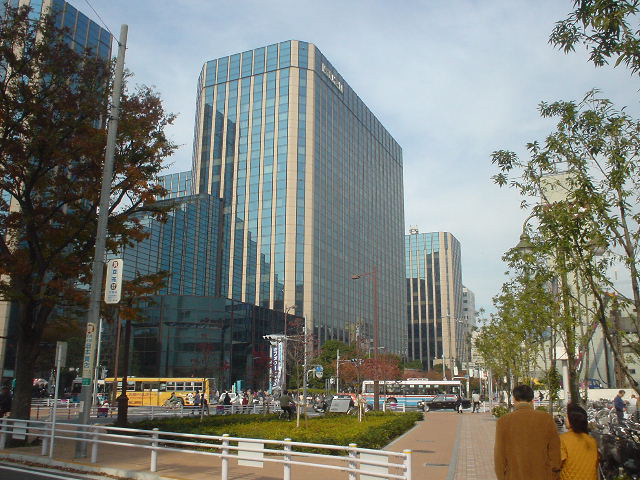
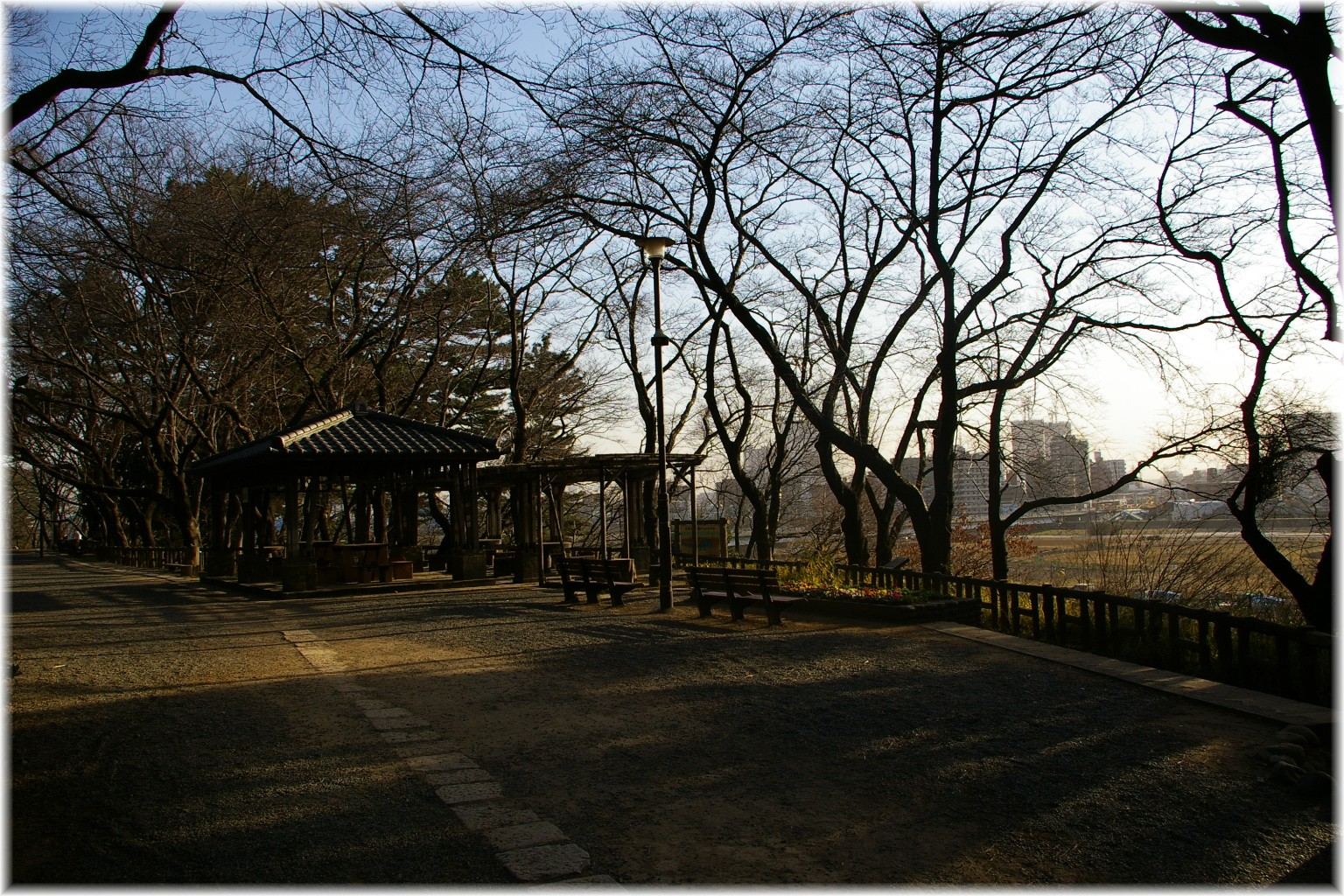
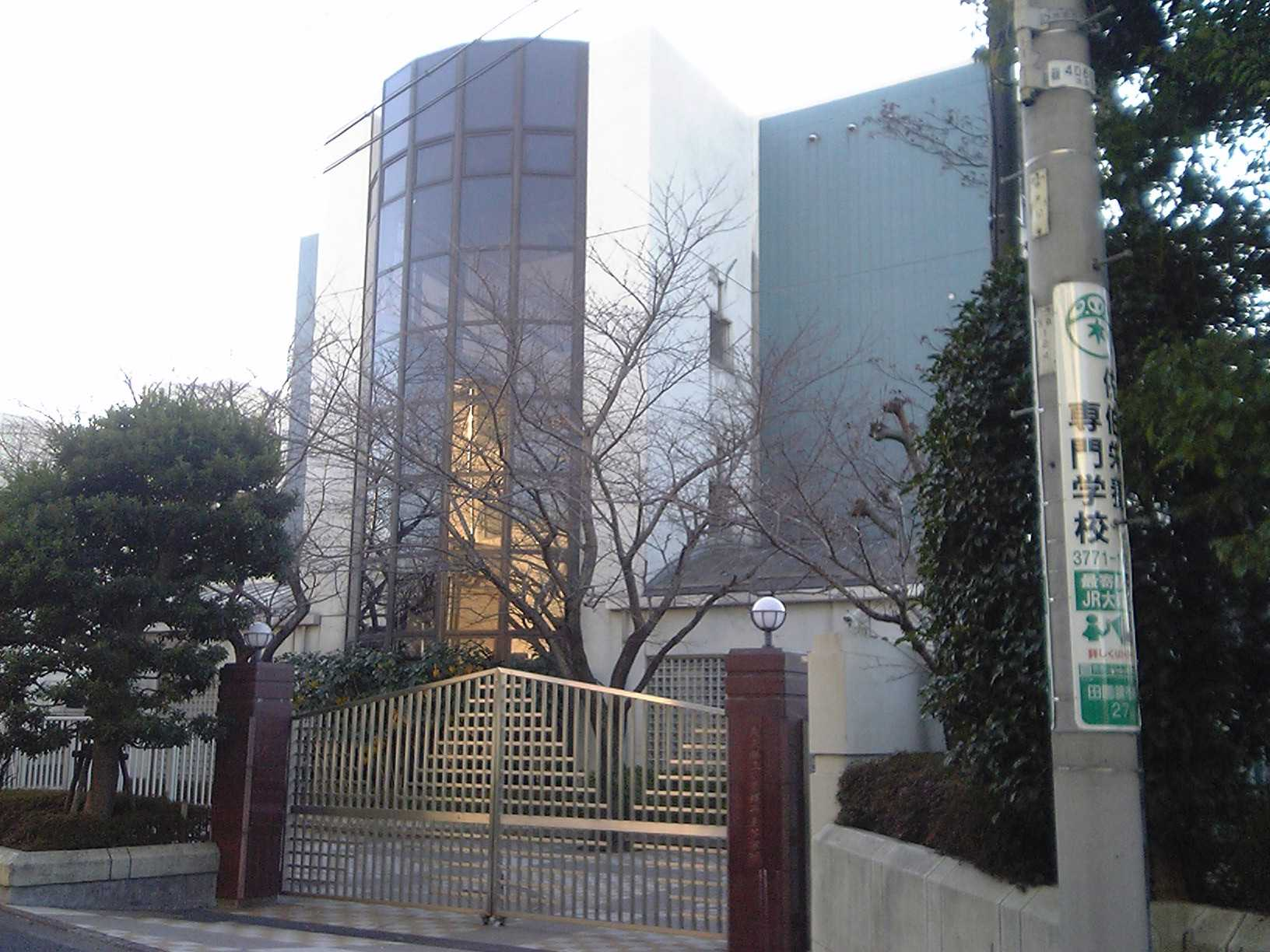
- Haneda Airport Kamata Ikegami Honmon-ji Keikyū Kamata Station Ōmori Tamagawadai Park Den Enchofu High School

- Flag Seal

- Location of Ōta in Tokyo Metropolis

- Ōta (Tokyo) Ōta (Kanto Area) Ōta (Japan)
- Coordinates: 35°33′41″N 139°42′58″E
- Country: Japan
- Region: Kantō
- Prefecture: Tokyo Metropolis

Government
  - Mayor: Akimasa Suzuki

Area
  - Total: 59.46 km^{2} (22.96 sq mi)

Population (March 1, 2024)
  - Total: 744,849
  - Density: 12,041/km^{2} (31,190/sq mi)
- Time zone: UTC+09 (JST)
- Symbols
  - Tree: Cinnamomum camphora
  - Flower: Prunus mume
  - Bird: Cettia diphone
- City office: Kamata 5-13-14, Ōta-ku, Tokyo 144-8621
- Website: www.city.ota.tokyo.jp

Ōta (大田区, Ōta-ku; Japanese pronunciation: [ò̞ó̞.tä́(.kɯ̈̀), ó̞ó̞-]) is a special ward in the Tokyo Metropolis in Japan. The ward refers to itself in English as Ōta City. It was formed in 1947 as a merger of Ōmori and Kamata following Tokyo City's transformation into Tokyo Metropolis. The southernmost of the 23 special wards, Ōta borders the special wards of Shinagawa, Meguro and Setagaya to the north, and Kōtō to the east. Across the Tama River in Kanagawa Prefecture is the city of Kawasaki, forming the boundaries to the south and west.

Ōta is the largest special ward in Tokyo by area, spanning 59.46 square kilometres (22.96 sq mi). As of 2024, the ward has an estimated population of 744,849, making it the third largest special ward by population, with a population density of 12,041 inhabitants per square kilometre (31,190/sq mi).

Notable neighborhoods and districts of Ōta include Kamata, the administrative center of the ward where the Ward Office and central Post Office is located, and Den-en-chōfu (田園調布), known for its wealthy residents and luxury homes. Haneda Airport, the busiest airport in Japan by passenger traffic is located in the ward.

== History ==
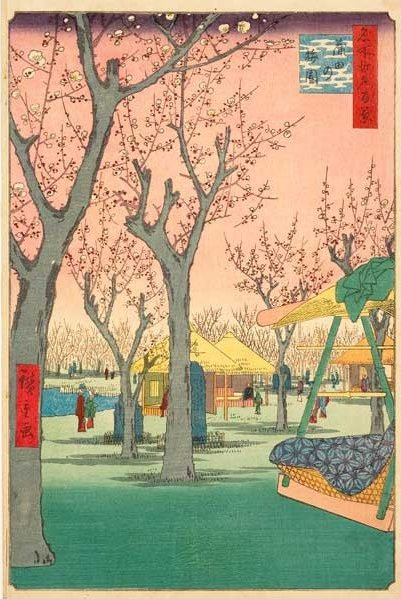
Utagawa Hiroshige "The Plum Gargens at Kamata" (1857)

The ward was founded on March 15, 1947, merging the old wards of Ōmori and Kamata. The ward's name originates from the combination of letters of the two merging wards, Ōmori (大森) and Kamata (蒲田), combined into Ōta (大田). The ward was previously second behind Setagaya in terms of being the largest special ward in Tokyo by area, but due to land reclamation in the Tokyo Bay for the expansion of the Haneda Airport (羽田空港), Ōta overtook Setagaya for first place.

Haneda Airport, now one of the two main domestic and international airports serving the Greater Tokyo Area (the other one being Narita Airport in Narita, Chiba) was first established as Haneda Airfield in 1931 in the town of Haneda, Ebara District of Tokyo Prefecture. Following Japan's surrender in 1945, the airfield was turned into the Haneda Army Air Base under the control of the United States Army. In the same year, Allied occupational authorities ordered the expansion of the airport, evicting people from the surroundings on 48 hours' notice. With the end of the occupation, the Americans returned part of the facility to Japanese control in 1952, completing the return in 1958. Haneda Airport first handled international traffic for Tokyo for the 1964 Tokyo Summer Olympics. Following the opening of Narita Airport in 1978, almost all international flights (with the exception of Taiwanese airlines) moved its operations to Narita Airport. International flights resumed in 2010 following the construction of a new International terminal.

== Demographics ==
Historical population
Year	Pop.	±%
1920	78,522	—
1930	245,457	+212.6%
1940	531,784	+116.7%
1945	213,000	−59.9%
1950	400,406	+88.0%
1960	706,219	+76.4%
1970	734,990	+4.1%
1980	661,147	−10.0%
1990	647,914	−2.0%
2000	658,132	+1.6%
2010	693,373	+5.4%
2020	748,081	+7.9%
Source: Censuses (Note: For years prior to 1950, figures cover the area of present-day Ota-ku.)

== Geography ==
=== Districts and neighborhoods ===
Former Ōmori Ward

- Chidori
- Chūō
- Den'enchōfu
- Den'enchōfuhon-chō
- Den'enchōfuminami
- Higashimagome
- Higashimine-chō
- Higashiyukigaya
- Ikegami
- Ishikawamachi
- Kamiikedai
- Kitamagome
- Kitamine-chō
- Kitasenzoku
- Kugahara
- Minamikugahara
- Minamimagome
- Minamisenzoku
- Minamiyukigaya
- Nakaikegami
- Nakamagome
- Nishimagome
- Nishimine-chō
- Ōmorihigashi
- Ōmorihonchō
- Ōmorikita
- Ōmoriminami
- Ōmorinaka
- Ōmorinishi
- San'nō
- Unoki
- Yukigayaōtsuka-chō

Former Kamata Ward

- Haginaka
- Haneda
- Hanedaasahi-chō
- Higashikamata
- Higashikōjiya
- Higashirokugō
- Higashiyaguchi
- Honhaneda
- Kamata
- Kamatahonchō
- Kitakōjiya
- Minamikamata
- Minamirokugō
- Nakarokugō
- Nishikamata
- Nishikōjiya
- Nishirokugō
- Shimomaruko
- Shinkamata
- Tamagawa
- Yaguchia

== Politics and government ==
Ōta is run by a city assembly of 50 elected members. The current mayor is Akimasa Suzuki since 2023, an independent affiliated with the Liberal Democratic Party.

Ōta is represented in the Tokyo Metropolitan Assembly by the Ōta district with seven representatives, while it is represented in the House of Representatives by the Tokyo 3rd and Tokyo 4th single-member districts.

=== Ōta Ward Assembly ===
As of April 2024, the current composition of the assembly is:

Governing parties: (30 seats)

- Liberal Democratic Party (15 seats)
- Komeito (11 seats)
- Tomin First no Kai (2 seats)
- Democratic Party for the People (1 seat)
- Independent (1 seat)

Opposition parties: (11 seats)

- Japanese Communist Party (5 seats)
- Constitutional Democratic Party (4 seats)
- Reiwa Shinsengumi (1 seat)
- Fair Democracy (1 seat)

Non-aligned parties (9 seats)

- Ishin no Kai (5 seats)
- Sanseito (1 seat)
- Rise up Japan (1 seat)
- Independent (2 seats)

=== Elections ===
- 2007 Ōta local election

== International relations ==
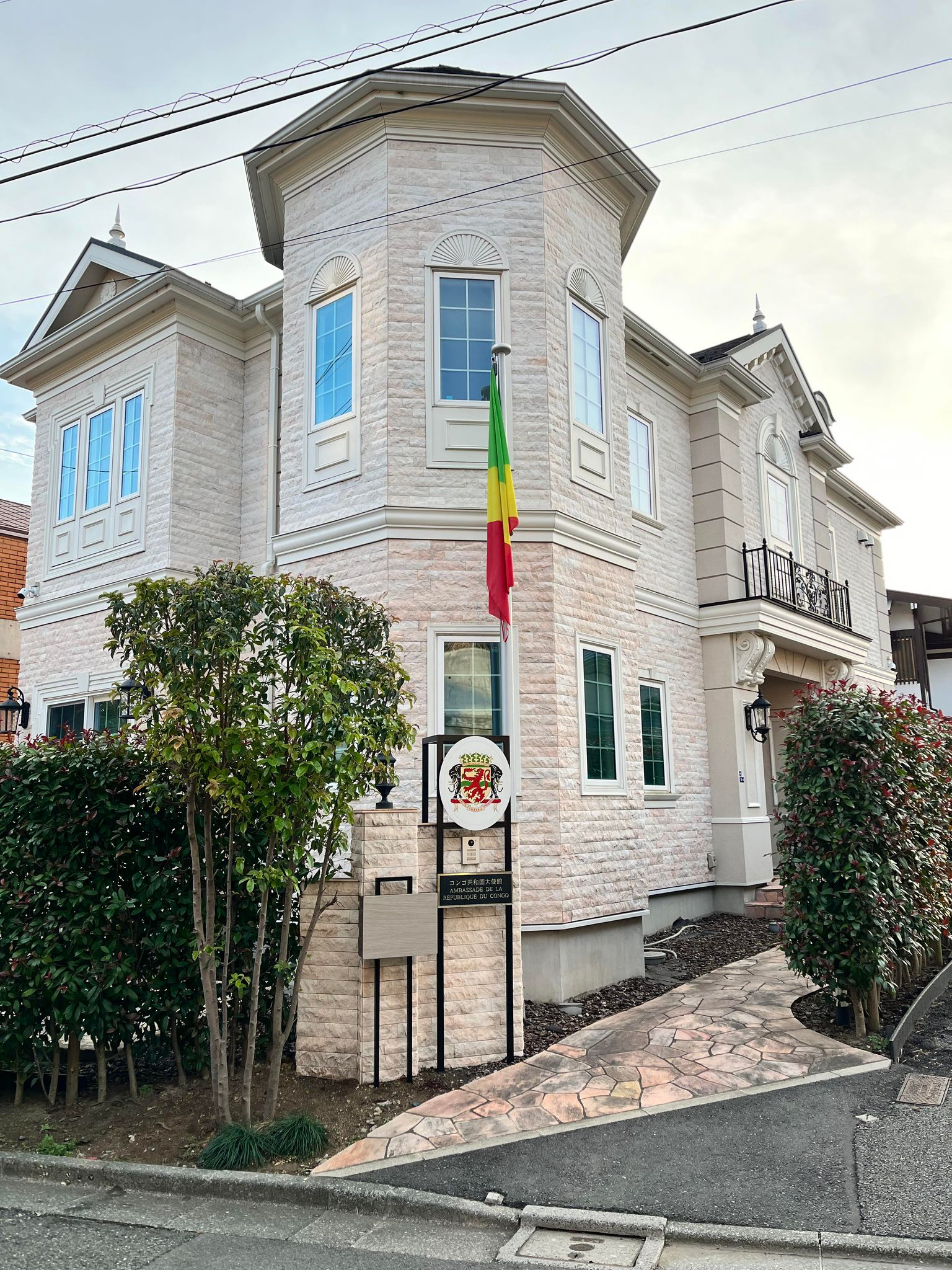
Embassy of Congo in Den-en-chōfu, Ōta

=== Sister city ===
- Salem, the Commonwealth of Massachusetts, the United States of America (since 1991)

=== Friendship city ===
- Chaoyang District, Beijing City, the People's Republic of China (since 1998)

=== Friendly cooperation city ===
- Dalian, Liaoning Province, the People's Republic of China (since 2009)

=== Diplomatioc missions in Ōta ===
- Embassy of the Republic of the Congo
- Honorary Consulate of Antigua and Barbuda in Tokyo

== Landmarks ==
=== Parks and scenic spots ===
- Den-en-chōfu, one of Japan's most exclusive residential areas
- Haneda Airport observation decks
- Heiwajima Park, site of a former World War II Allied prisoner of war camp
- Ikegami Honmon-ji, the head Buddhist temple of the Nichiren Shū
  - Honmon-ji Reihōden Museum
  - Graves of Kawakami Gensai, Kōda Rohan, Aya Kōda, Banboku Ōno, Rikidōzan
- Nishi-rokugō Park, a children's playground known as "Tire Park"
- Senzokuike Park, the park surrounding Senzoku Pond
  - Grave of Katsu Kaishū
  - Cenotaph for Saigō Takamori built by Katsu
- Tamagawadai Park
  - Tamagawadai Park Kofun Exhibition Room
- Tokyo Port Wild Bird Park
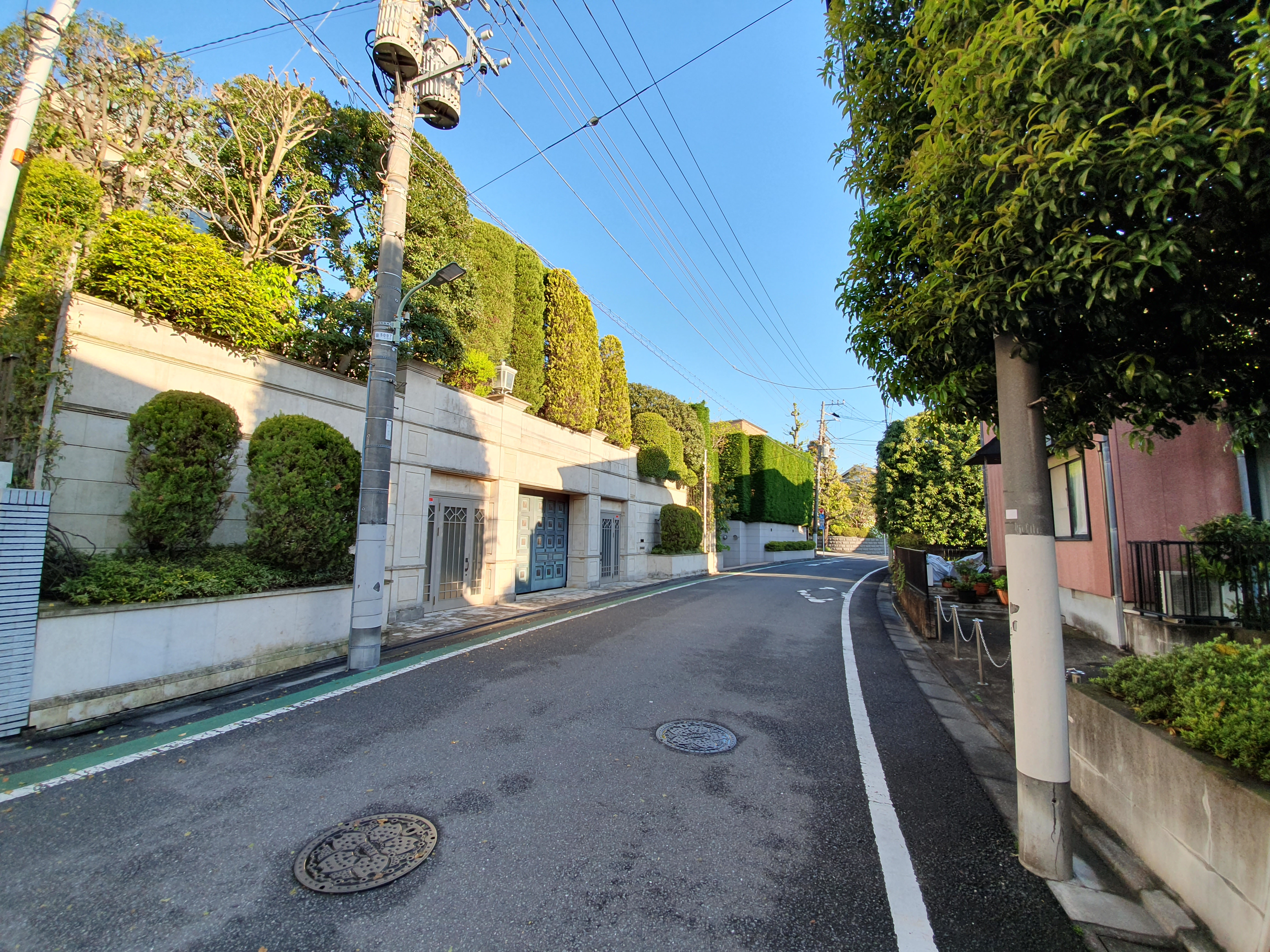
Den-en-chōfu

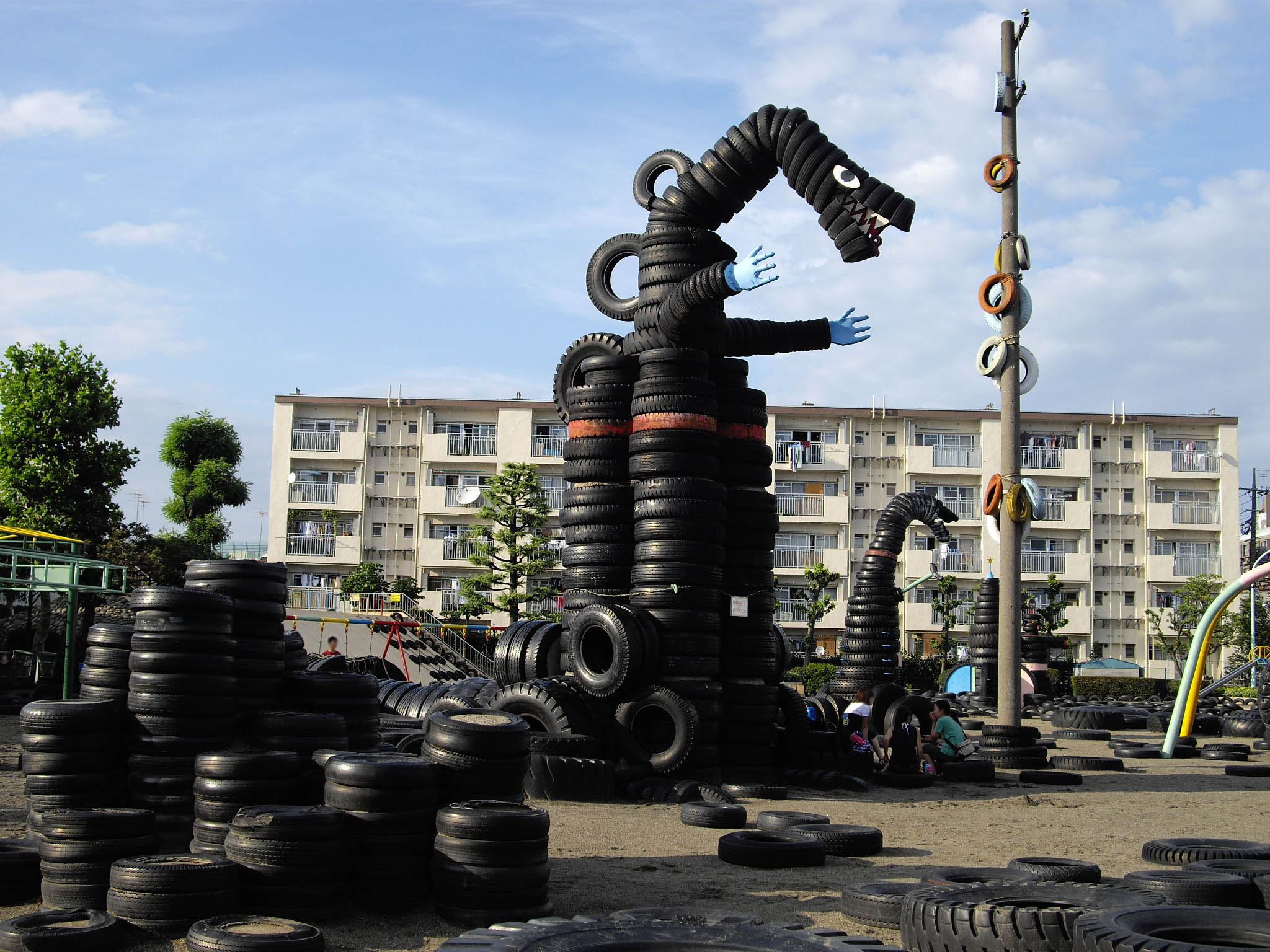
Nishi-rokugō Park

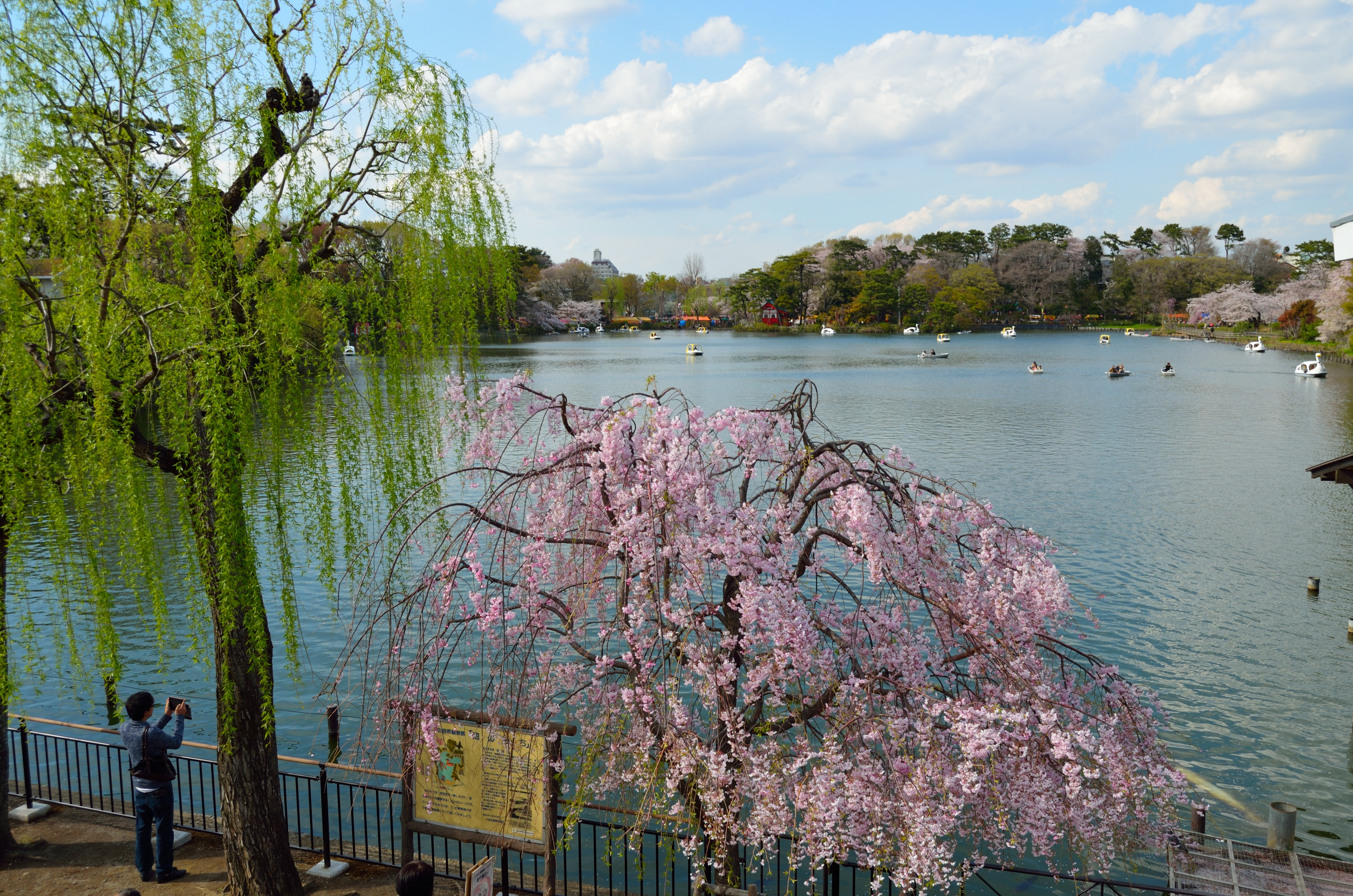
Senzokuike Park

=== Cultural institutions ===
- Katsu Kaishū Memorial Museum
- Omori Nori Museum
- Ota City Local History Museum
- Ozaki Shirō Memorial Museum, a literary museum dedicated to Ozaki Shirō
- Ryūshi Memorial Hall, an art museum dedicated to the Nihonga paintings of Kawabata Ryūshi
- Sannō Sōdō Memorial Museum, a literary museum dedicated to Tokutomi Sohō
- Shōwa Era Lifestyle Museum, a folk museum housed in a renovated private residence originally built in 1951

== Transportation ==
=== Air ===
- Haneda Airport

=== Rail ===
- JR East
  - Keihin-Tōhoku Line: Ōmori, Kamata Stations
- Keikyū Corporation
  - Main Line: Heiwajima, Ōmorimachi, Umeyashiki, Keikyū-Kamata, Zōshiki, Rokugōdote Stations
  - Airport Line: Keikyū-Kamata, Kojiya, Ōtorii, Anamori-inari, Tenkūbashi, Haneda Airport Terminal 3, Haneda Airport Terminal 1·2 Stations
- Tokyu Corporation
  - Tamagawa Line: Tamagawa, Numabe, Unoki, Shimomaruko, Musashi-nitta, Yaguchinowatashi, Kamata Stations
  - Ikegami Line: Nagahara, Senzoku-ike, Ishikawa-dai, Yukigaya-ōtsuka, Ontakesan, Kugahara, Chidorichō, Ikegami, Hasunuma, Kamata Stations
  - Ōimachi Line: Kita-Senzoku, Ookayama Stations
  - Tōyoko Line: Den-en-chōfu, Tamagawa Stations
  - Meguro Line: Ookayama, Den-en-chōfu, Tamagawa Stations
- Toei Subway
  - Asakusa Line: Magome, Nishi-magome Stations
- Tokyo Monorail
  - Haneda Airport Line: Ryutsu Center, Shōwajima, Seibijō, Tenkūbashi, Haneda Airport Terminal 3, Shin Seibijō, Haneda Airport Terminal 1, Haneda Airport Terminal 2 Stations

=== Highways ===
- Shuto Expressway
  - No. 1 Haneda Route (Edobashi JCT - Iriya)
  - B Bayshore Route (Namiki - Kawasaki-ukishima JCT)
- National highways
  - Route 1
  - Route 15
  - Route 133
  - Route 357

== Economy ==
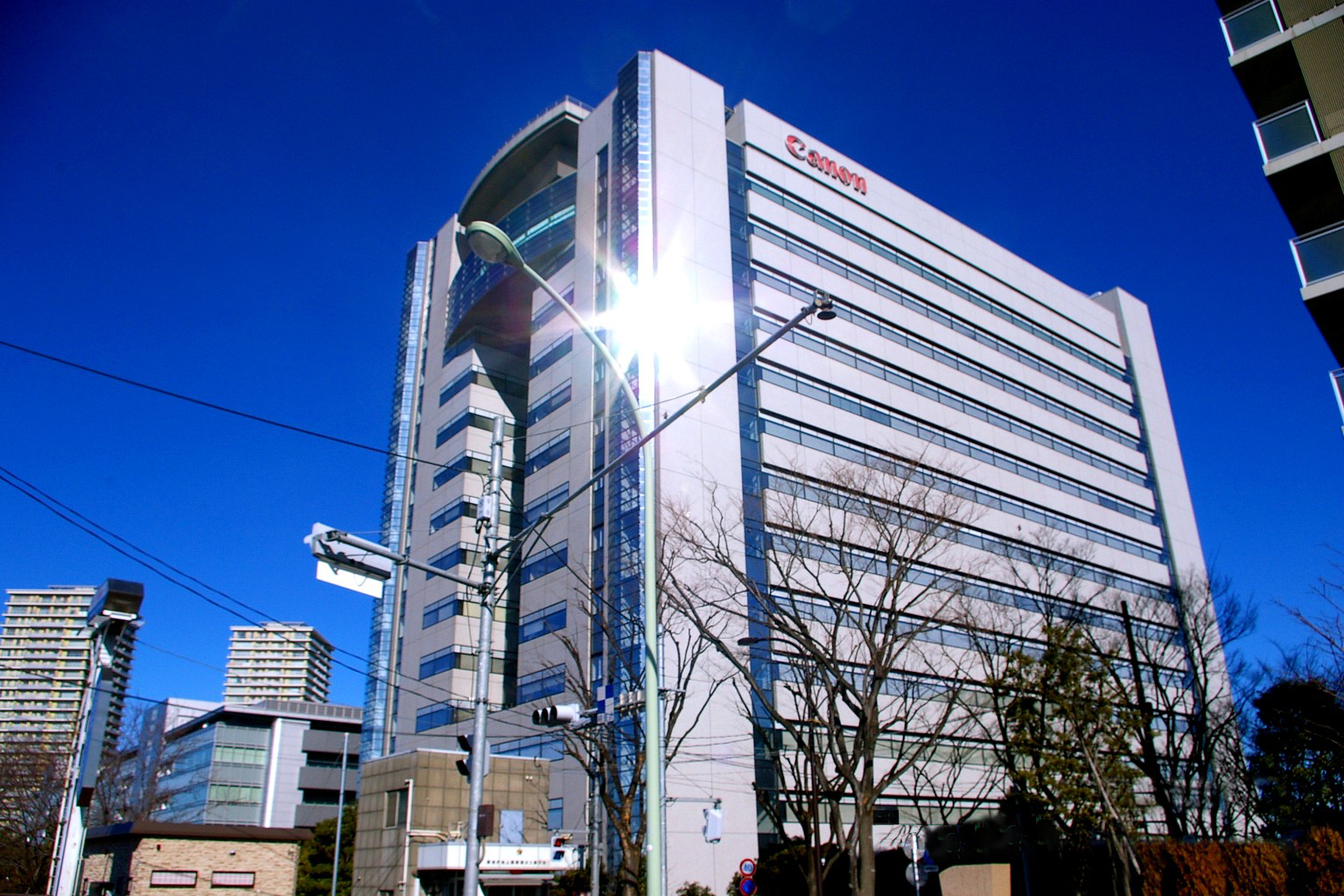
Canon headquarters

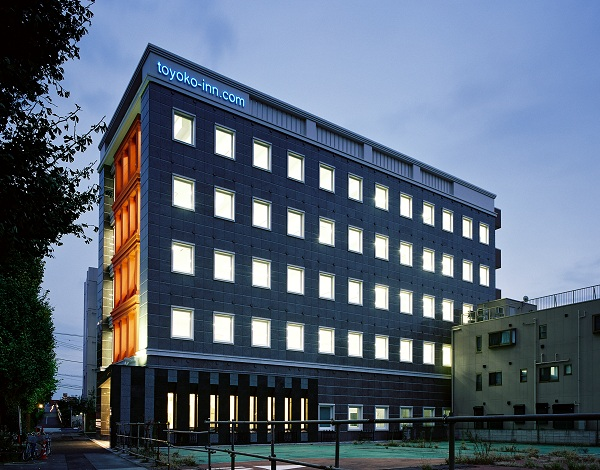
Toyoko Inn headquarters in Kamata

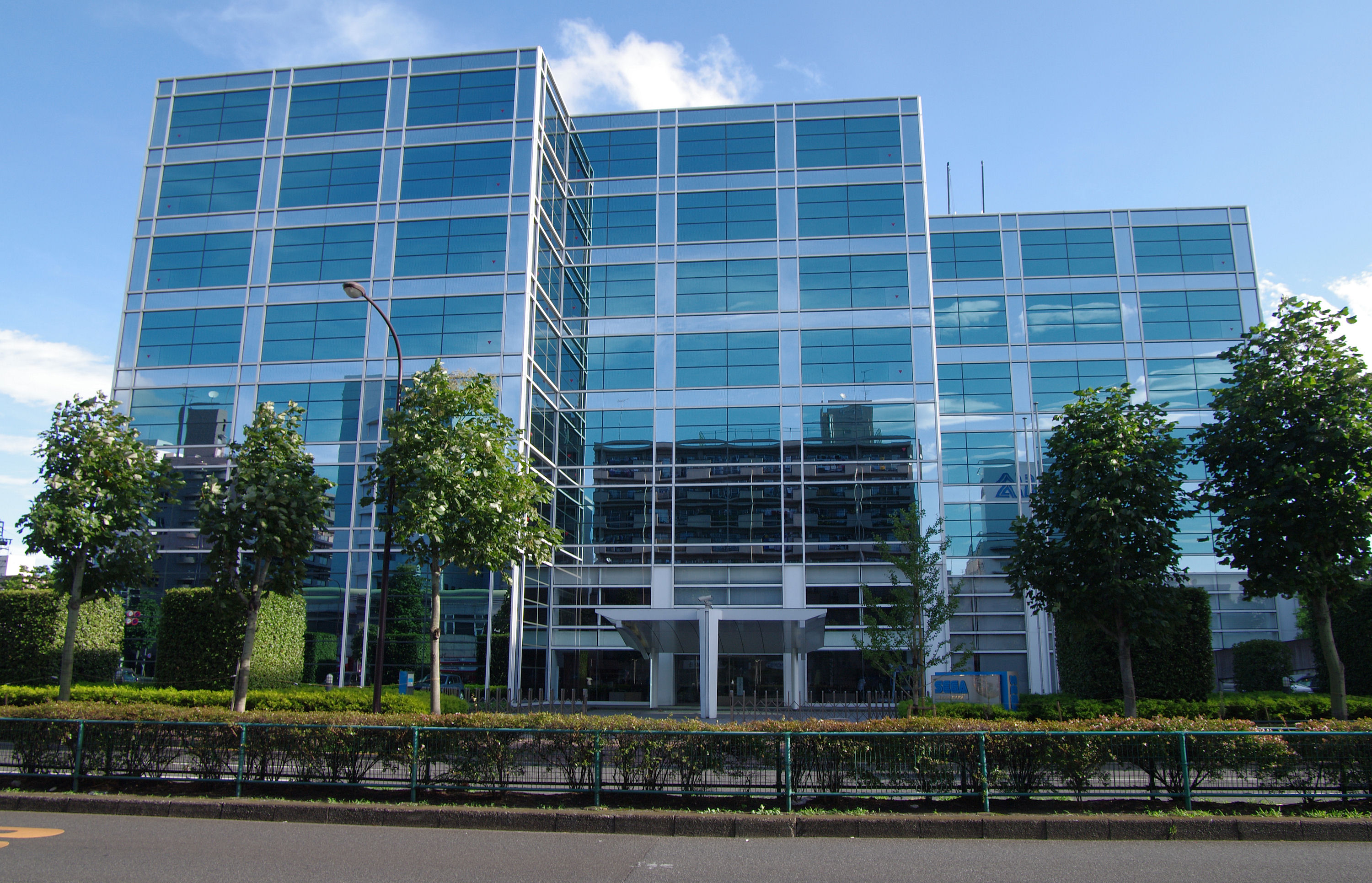
Sega original headquarters. After its offices were relocated to Shinagawa in January 2018, the original office in Ota was later sold in February 2019 and will likely be torn down.

The following companies have their headquarters in Ōta.

- ANA Wings (subsidiary of All Nippon Airways)
- Alps Electric
- Canon
- Disco Corporation, manufacturer of semiconductor production equipment
- Ebara
- Ikegami Tsushinki, manufacturer of broadcast equipment
- Skymark Airlines
- Takasago International Corporation, a flavours and fragrances company
- Toyoko Inn

=== Former operations ===
Namco, best known for video game franchises such as Pac-Man, Galaxian, and Ace Combat, was headquartered in Ota. The company moved its operations there in 1985, using the funds generated from the successful Family Computer port of Xevious to fund the construction of its office. The building was taken over by Namco Bandai Games after it absorbed Namco in 2006, and later by an unrelated Namco company that focused on video arcades and theme parks. The newer Namco company moved out of the building in 2014 and it was demolished two years later.

Prior to the merger with Japan Airlines, Japan Air System had its headquarters at Haneda Airport in Ōta.

In 2000 All Nippon Airways was headquartered by Tokyo International Airport in Ōta. In 2002 Air Nippon was headquartered on the fifth floor of the Utility Center Building (ユーティリティセンタービル, Yūtiriti Sentā Biru) at Haneda Airport in Ōta. The ANA subsidiary Air Nippon Network was also based at the airport.

Before its dissolution, Galaxy Airlines was headquartered in the ARC Building on the airport grounds.

Sega and its parent company Sega Sammy Holdings, best known for its Sonic the Hedgehog franchise, was originally headquartered in Ōta. However, Sega Sammy Holdings announced in April 2017 that it would relocate its head office functions and domestic subsidiaries to Shinagawa-ku by January 2018. This was to consolidate scattered head office functions including Sega Sammy Holdings, Sammy Corporation, Sega Holdings, Sega Games, Atlus, Sammy Network, and Dartslive. After the relocation to Shinagawa was complete, Sega's previous headquarters in Ōta was later sold in February 2019 and will likely be torn down.

Gakken was headquartered in Ōta from 1962 until 2008 when they moved their headquarters to Shinagawa.

== Education ==
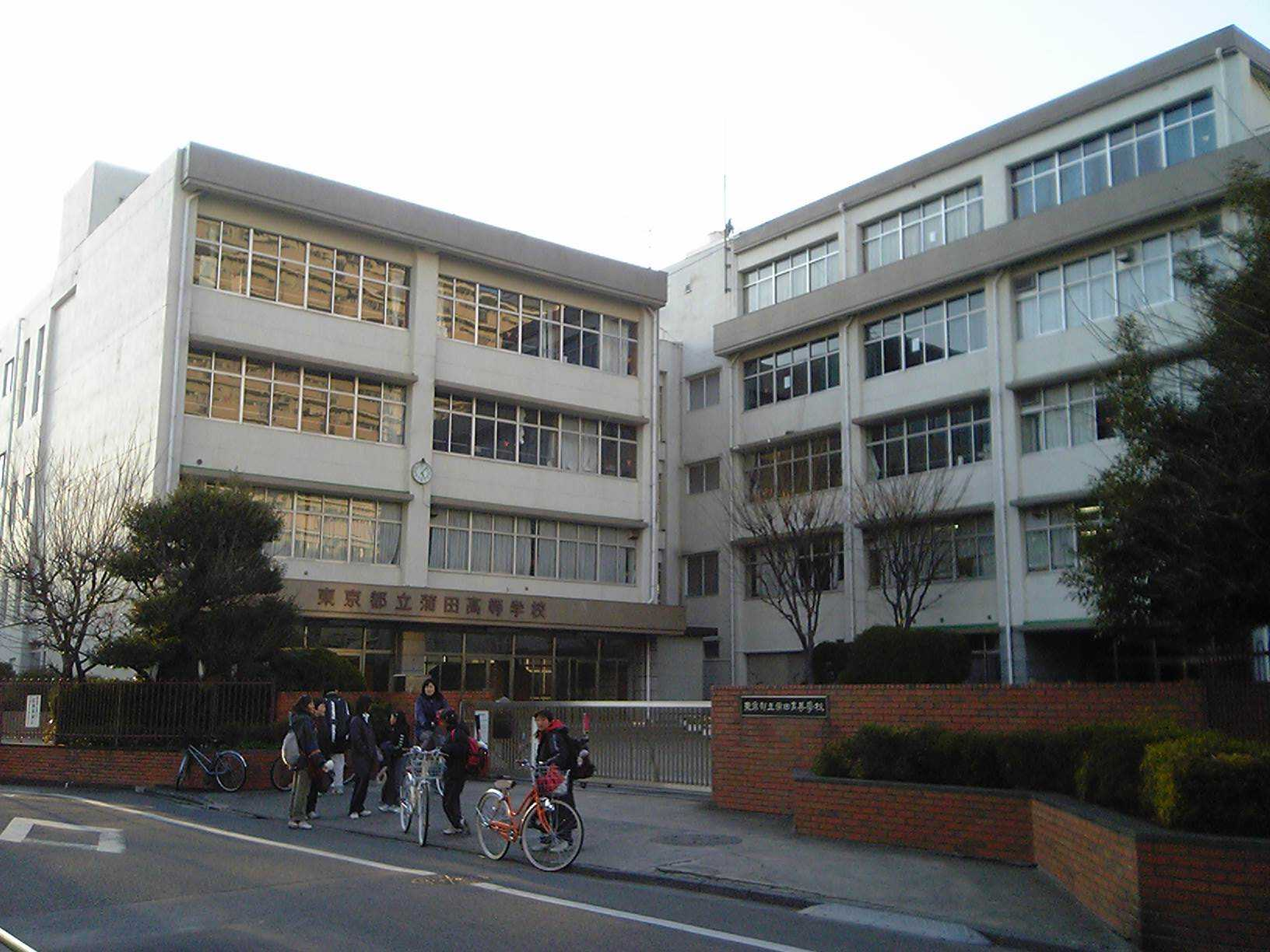
Kamata High School

=== Colleges and universities ===
- Toho University Ōmori Campus
- Tokyo Institute of Technology Ōokayama Campus
- Showa University Senzoku Campus
- Tokyo University of Technology Kamata Campus

=== Public high schools ===
The following public high schools are located in Ōta, operated by the Tokyo Metropolitan Government Board of Education.

- Den Enchofu High School (東京都立田園調布高等学校)
- Kamata High School (東京都立蒲田高等学校)
- Mihara High School (東京都立美原高等学校)
- Omori High School (東京都立大森高等学校)
- Ota Sakuradai High School (東京都立大田桜台高等学校)
- Rokugoh Technical High School (東京都立六郷工科高等学校)
- Tsubasa Sogo High School (東京都立つばさ総合高等学校)
- Yukigaya High School (東京都立雪谷高等学校)

=== Private high schools ===
- Tokyo High School (東京高等学校)
- Tokyo Jitsugyo High School (東京実業高等学校)

=== Elementary and junior high schools ===
Public elementary and junior high schools are operated by Ōta City Board of Education (大田区教育委員会).

==== Municipal junior high schools ====
- Den en Chofu Junior High School (田園調布中学校)
- Haneda Junior High School (羽田中学校)
- Hasunuma Junior High School (蓮沼中学校)
- Higashi Chofu Junior High School (東調布中学校)
- Ishikawadai Junior High School (石川台中学校)
- Izumo Junior High School (出雲中学校)
- Kaizuka Junior High School (貝塚中学校)
- Kamata Junior High School (蒲田中学校)
- Kojiya Junior High School (糀谷中学校)
- Magome Junior High School (馬込中学校)
- Magome Higashi Junior High School (馬込東中学校)
- Minami Rokugo Junior High School (南六郷中学校)
- Misono Junior High School (御園中学校)
- Omori No. 1 Junior High School (大森第一中学校)
- Omori No. 2 Junior High School (大森第二中学校)
- Omori No. 3 Junior High School (大森第三中学校)
- Omori No. 4 Junior High School (大森第四中学校)
- Omori No. 6 Junior High School (大森第六中学校)
- Omori No. 7 Junior High School (大森第七中学校)
- Omori No. 8 Junior High School (大森第八中学校)
- Omori No. 10 Junior High School (大森第十中学校)
- Omori Higashi Junior High School (大森東中学校)
- Rokugo Junior High School (六郷中学校)
- Shimoda Junior High School (志茂田中学校)
- Toho Junior High School (東蒲中学校)
- Yaguchi Junior High School (矢口中学校)
- Yasukata Junior High School (安方中学校)
- Yukigaya Junior High School (雪谷中学校)

==== Municipal elementary schools ====
- Aioi Elementary School (相生小学校)
- Akamatsu Elementary School (赤松小学校)
- Chidori Elementary School (千鳥小学校)
- Chisetsu Elementary School (池雪小学校)
- Chofu Otsuka Elementary School (調布大塚小学校)
- Den en Chofu Elementary School (田園調布小学校)
- Haginaka Elementary School (萩中小学校)
- Haneda Elementary School (羽田小学校)
- Higashi Chofu No. 1 Elementary School (東調布第一小学校)
- Higashi Chofu No. 3 Elementary School (東調布第三小学校)
- Higashi Kojiya Elementary School (東糀谷小学校)
- Higashi Rokugo Elementary School (東六郷小学校)
- Ikegami Elementary School (池上小学校)
- Ikegami No. 2 Elementary School (池上第二小学校)
- Iriarai No. 1 Elementary School (入新井第一小学校)
- Iriarai No. 2 Elementary School (入新井第二小学校)
- Iriarai No. 4 Elementary School (入新井第四小学校)
- Iriarai No. 5 Elementary School (入新井第五小学校)
- Izumo Elementary School (出雲小学校)
- Kaio Elementary School (開桜小学校)
- Kamata Elementary School (蒲田小学校)
- Kita Kojiya Elementary School (北糀谷小学校)
- Koike Elementary School (小池小学校)
- Kojiya Elementary School (糀谷小学校)
- Kugahara Elementary School (久原小学校)
- Magome Elementary School (馬込小学校)
- Magome No. 2 Elementary School (馬込第二小学校)
- Magome No. 3 Elementary School (馬込第三小学校)
- Michizuka Elementary School (道塚小学校)
- Minami Rokugo Elementary School (南六郷小学校)
- Minemachi Elementary School (嶺町小学校)
- Nakahaginaka Elementary School (中萩中小学校)
- Nakarokugo Elementary School (仲六郷小学校)
- Nakatomi Elementary School (中富小学校)
- Nanpo Elementary School (南蒲小学校)
- Nishi Rokugo Elementary School (西六郷小学校)
- Omori No. 1 Elementary School (大森第一小学校)
- Omori No. 3 Elementary School (大森第三小学校)
- Omori No. 4 Elementary School (大森第四小学校)
- Omori No. 5 Elementary School (大森第五小学校)
- Omori Higashi Elementary School (大森東小学校)
- Onazuka Elementary School (おなづか小学校)
- Rokugo Elementary School (六郷小学校)
- Sanno Elementary School (山王小学校)
- Senzokuike Elementary School (洗足池小学校)
- Shimizukubo Elementary School (清水窪小学校)
- Shimoda Elementary School (志茂田小学校)
- Shinshuku Elementary School (新宿小学校)
- Shosen Elementary School (松仙小学校)
- Takahata Elementary School (高畑小学校)
- Tamagawa Elementary School (多摩川小学校)
- Toho Elementary School (東蒲小学校)
- Tokumochi Elementary School (徳持小学校)
- Tonan Elementary School (都南小学校)
- Umeda Elementary School (梅田小学校)
- Yaguchi Elementary School (矢口小学校)
- Yaguchi Higashi Elementary School (矢口東小学校)
- Yaguchi Nishi Elementary School (矢口西小学校)
- Yukigaya Elementary School (雪谷小学校)

=== International schools ===
- Tokyo Korean 6th Elementary School (東京朝鮮第六初級学校) - North Korean school

The Deutsche Schule Tokyo was previously located in Ōta before relocating to Yokohama, Kanagawa Prefecture in 1970.

=== Public libraries ===
Ōta operates several public libraries, including:

- Ota Library
- Hamatake Library
- Haneda Library
- Ikegami Library
- Iriarai Library
- Kamata Library
- Kamata Ekimae Library
- Kugahara Library
- Magome Library
- Omori East Library
- Omori South Library
- Omori West Library
- Rokugo Library
- Senzokuike Library
- Shimomaruko Library
- Tamagawa Library

== Notable people ==
- Tetsuya Fujimori, professional shogi player.
- Aya Fujita, professional shogi player.
- Hiroko Maruyama, voice actress.
- Urara Matsubayashi, actress.
- Aemu Oyama, football player
- Kintaro Usuda, boxer.
- Marina Watanabe, actress, singer, TV-personality.
