= Nagahara Station (Tokyo) =

Railway station in Tokyo, Japan

Coordinates: 35°36′08″N 139°41′53″E

Nagahara Station 長原駅

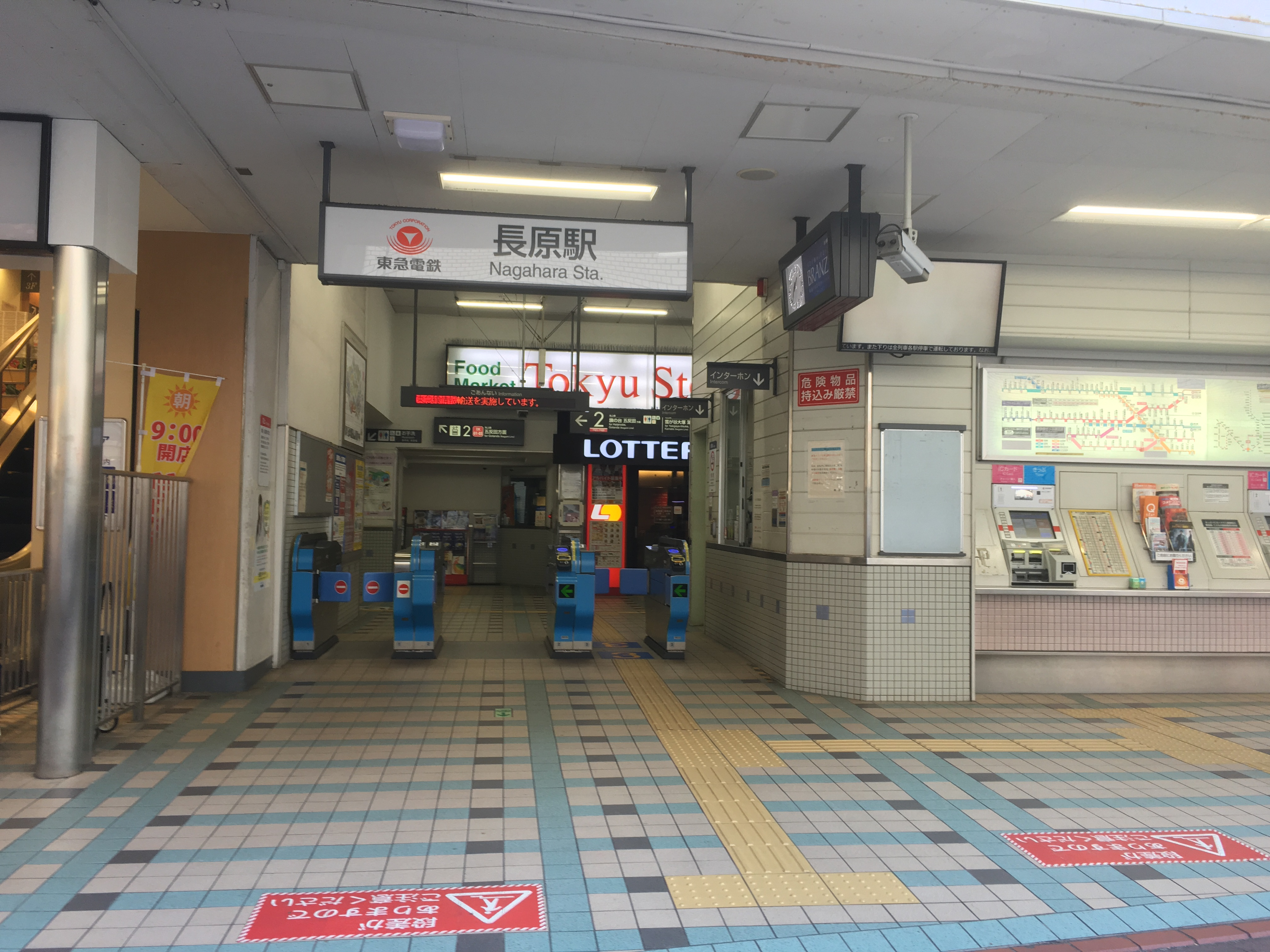
- Front of the station, 2019

General information
- Location: Kami-ikedai, Ota, Tokyo （東京都大田区上池台） Japan
- Operator: Tōkyū Railways
- Line: Ikegami Line
- Platforms: 2 side platforms
- Tracks: 2
- Connections: Bus stop

Construction
- Structure type: Underground

Other information
- Station code: IK06

History
- Opened: 28 August 1927; 99 years ago

Services
Preceding station	Tōkyū Railways	Following station
Senzoku-ike towards Kamata	Ikegami Line	Hatanodai towards Gotanda
Location
- Location within Special wards of Tokyo Location within Tokyo Bay and Bōsō Peninsula Location within Tokyo Location within Japan

Nagahara Station (長原駅, Nagahara-eki) is a railway station on the Tokyu Ikegami Line in Ota, Tokyo, Japan, operated by the private railway operator Tokyu Corporation.

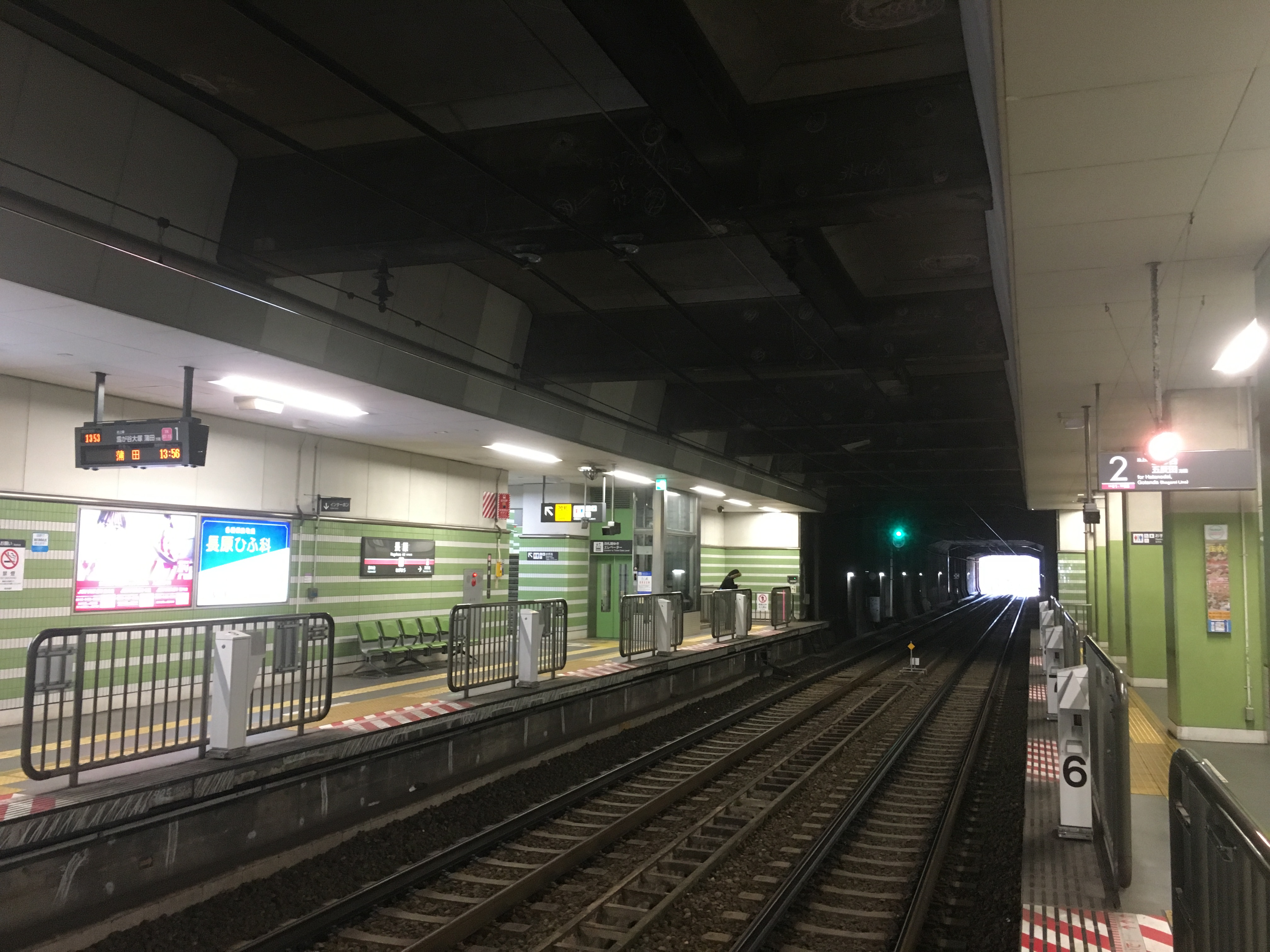
Station platforms, 2019

== Station layout ==
The station has two underground side platforms.

=== Platforms ===
1	■ Tokyu Ikegami Line	for Yukigaya-Ōtsuka, Ikegami, and Kamata
2	■ Tokyu Ikegami Line	for Hatanodai, Togoshi-Ginza, and Gotanda

== History ==
The station opened on 28 August 1927. It was rebuilt as an underground station in June 1972.

== Bus services ==
- Nagahara bus stop (Tokyu Bus)
