= Den-en-chōfu =

Neighborhood in western Ōta, Tokyo, Japan

Coordinates: 35.59°N 139.67°E

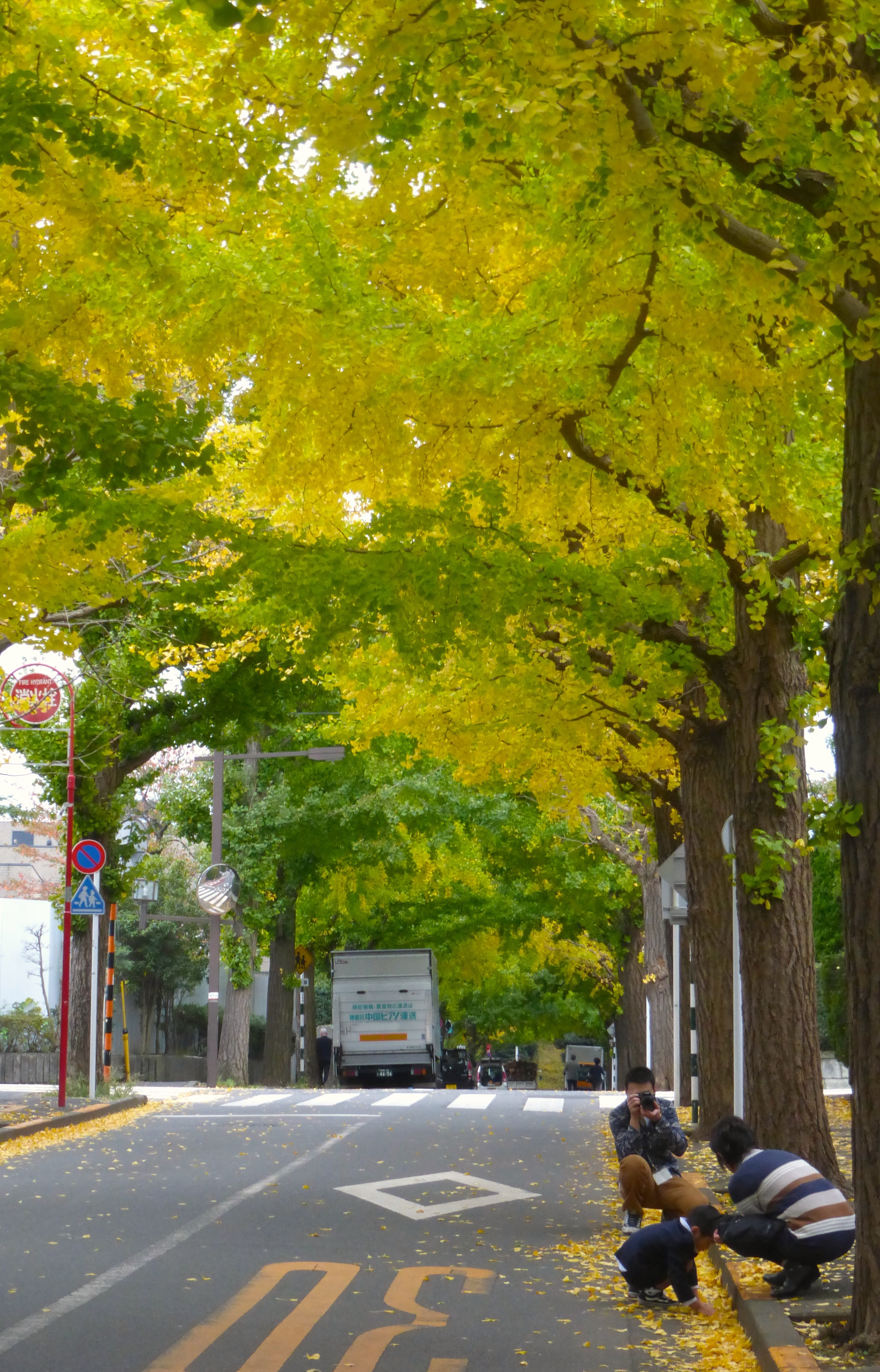
A boulevard seen from Den-en-chōfu Station

Den-en-chōfu (田園調布) is a residential neighborhood located in western Ōta in southern Tokyo, Japan. It is known as one of the most exclusive neighborhoods in Tokyo.

== History ==
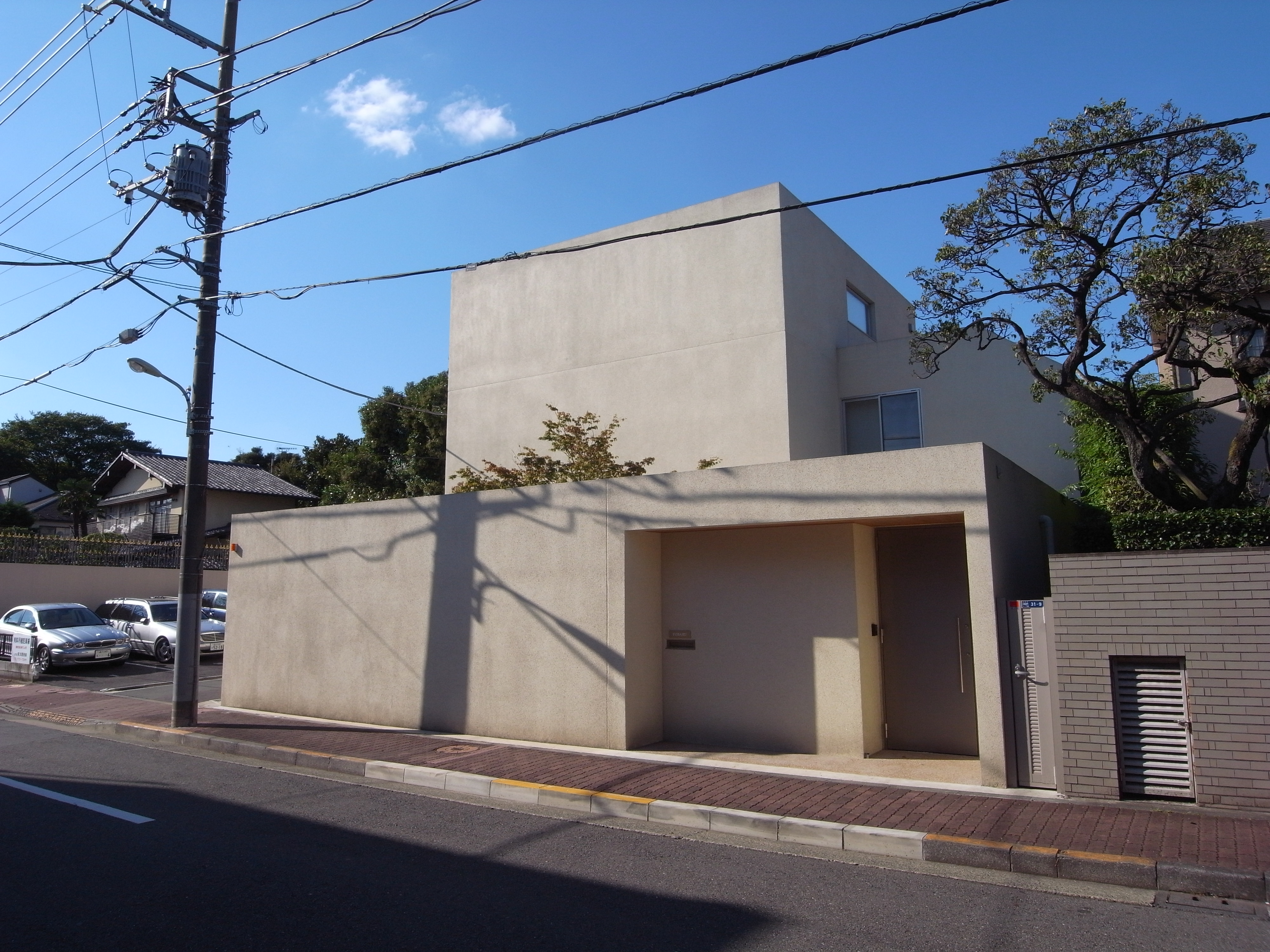
House in Den-en-chōfu

Den-en-chōfu was built based on the "Garden City" idea originally developed by the British city planner Ebenezer Howard.

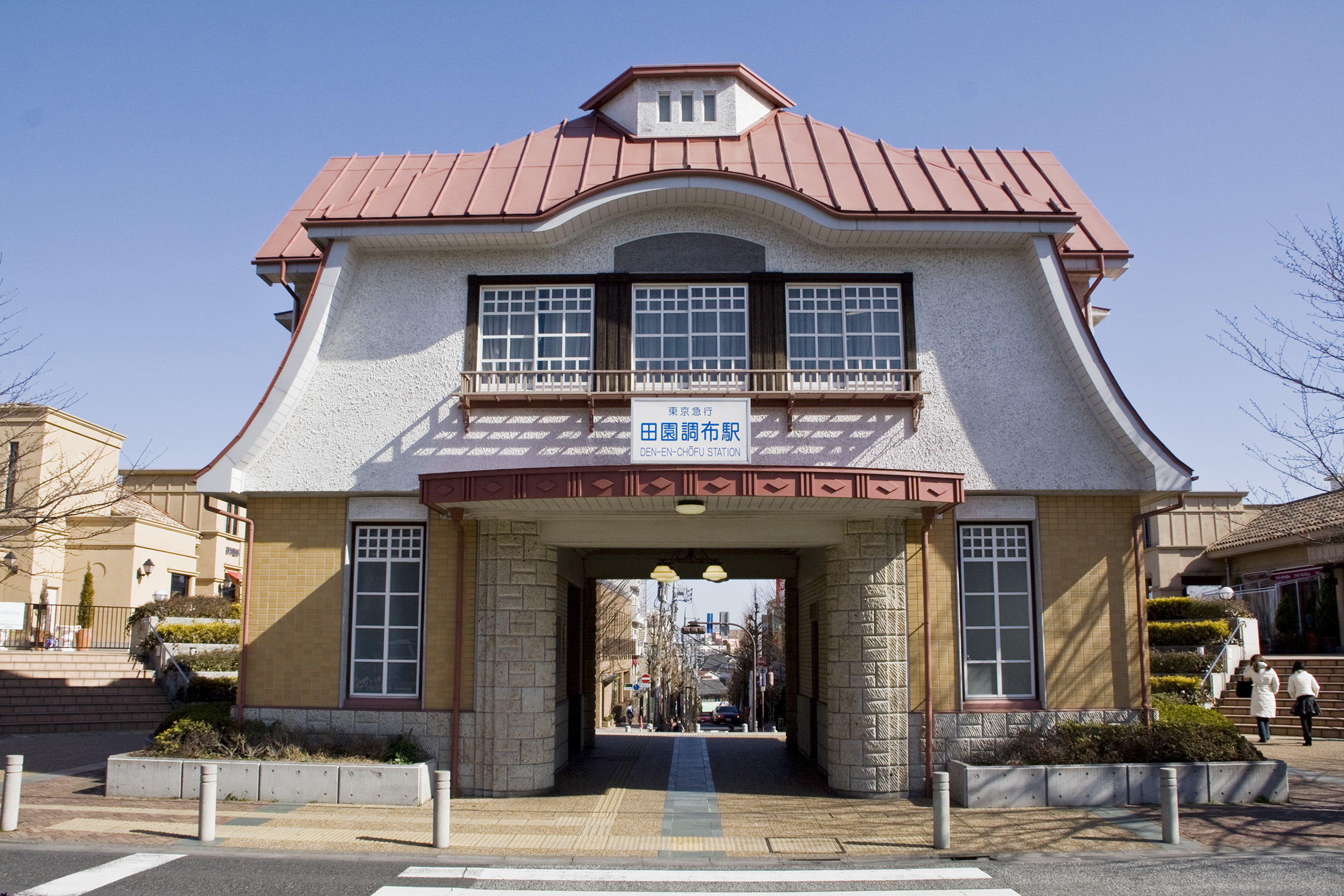
Den-en-chōfu Station

Den-en-chōfu was planned as a garden suburb of Tokyo. In the early 1900s, financier Eiichi Shibusawa bought, named, and developed the area by emulating the garden suburbs that were growing in metropolitan areas around the world, particularly those in Greater London. Originally, Den-en-chōfu was developed by the Garden City Company (田園都市株式会社, Den'entoshi Kabushiki-gaisha).

Although the area was developing at an adequate pace, it was the Great Kantō Earthquake of 1923 that guaranteed his success. Central Tokyo was leveled in the earthquake, but Den-en-chōfu was virtually untouched; in the aftermath, there was an exodus of people from the central city to the suburbs.

== Modern times ==
Den-en-chōfu is one of Tokyo's most famous and exclusive neighborhoods, where many business executives and celebrities reside. The residences are very expensive and fairly large by Tokyo standards, and the district is often compared to Beverly Hills, Los Angeles.

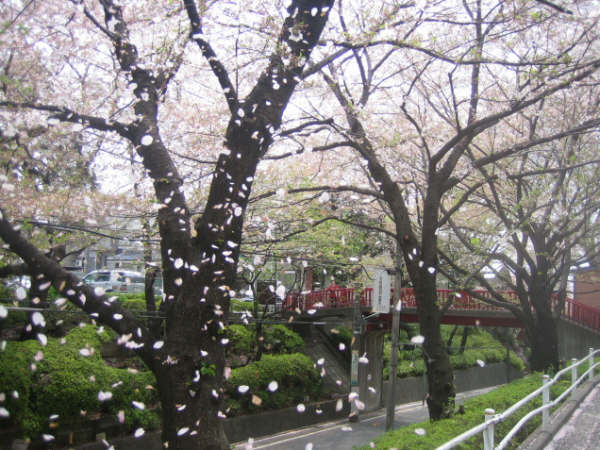
Cherry blossom season in Den-en-chōfu

Being 10 km away from the city center, the area is home to several natural parks. Den-en-chōfu has its own regulations for construction, in order to preserve the area's small-town atmosphere.

Den-en-chōfu's success has influenced neighboring areas along Tōkyū railway lines in western Meguro, including the Yakumo, Kakinokizaka, Nakane, Okusawa and Jiyūgaoka neighbourhoods.

== Education ==
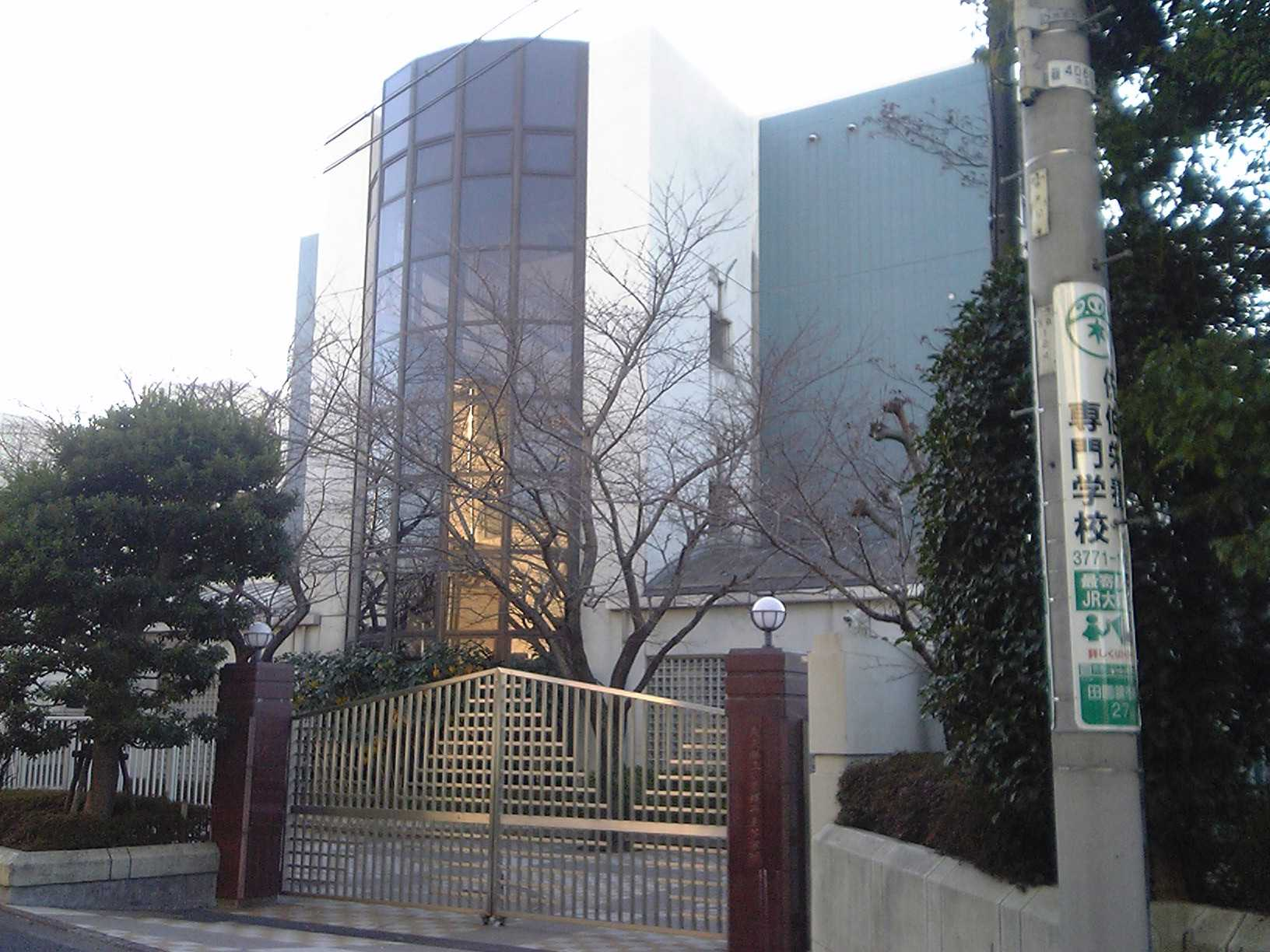
Den Enchofu High School

Ōta Ward operates the public elementary and junior high schools in Den-en-chōfu.

Most of Den-en-chōfu is zoned to Den-en-chōfu Elementary School (田園調布小学校) and Den-en-chōfu Junior High School (田園調布中学校), while parts of 1-chome are zoned to Chōfu Ōtsuka Elementary School (調布大塚小学校) and Ishikawadai Junior High School (石川台中学校).

The Tokyo Metropolitan Government Board of Education operates Den-en-chōfu High School.

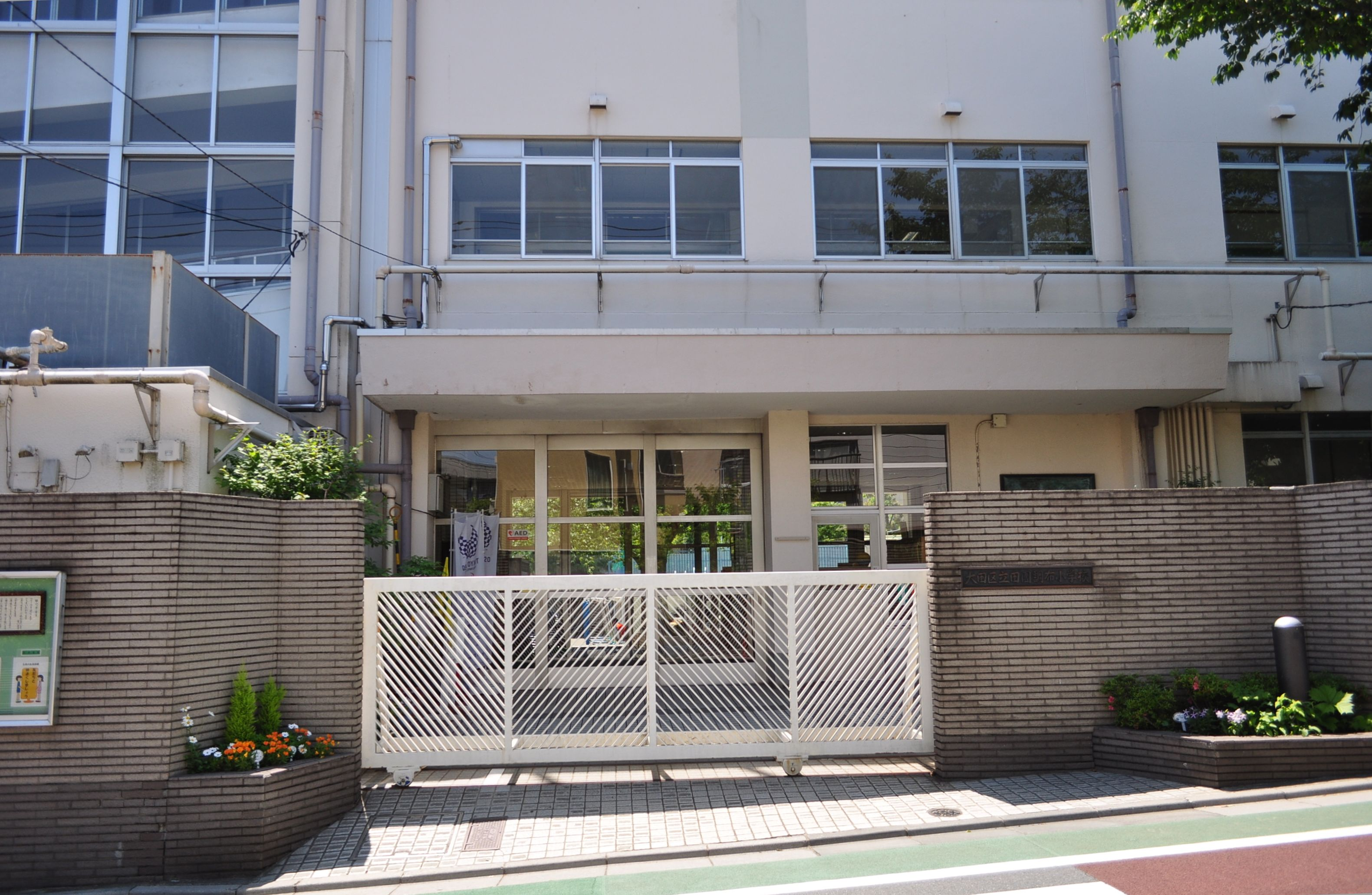
Den-en-chōfu Elementary School

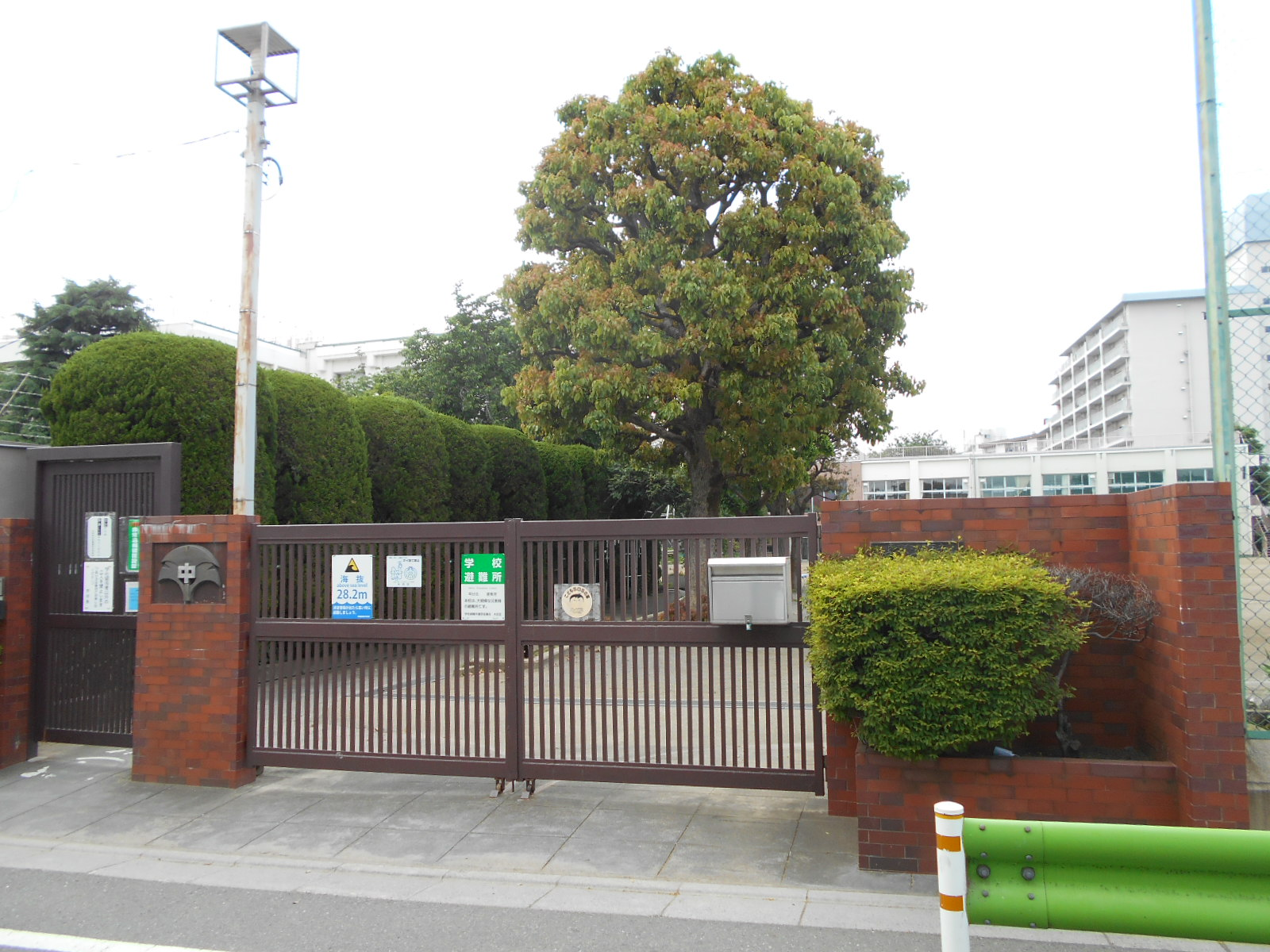
Den-en-chōfu Junior High School

== Residents ==
Well-known residents of the area include:

- Ayumi Hamasaki, singer
- Hiroshi Itsuki, singer
- Katsuya Nomura, baseball player/manager
- Kiichi Nakai, actor
- Max Matsuura, recording executive
- Shigeo Nagashima, baseball player/manager
- Shintaro Ishihara, former governor of Tokyo
- Yoshinori Kobayashi, manga artist
- Yukio Hatoyama, former Prime Minister
