= Akimasa Suzuki =

Japanese politician

- 鈴木 晶雅

Mayor of Ōta
- Incumbent
- Assumed office 27 April 2023
- Preceding: Matsubara Tadayoshi

Member of the Tokyo Metropolitan Assembly
- In office July 2020 – 3 April 2023
- Constituency: Ōta Ward
- In office April 2003 – 22 July 2017
- Constituency: Ōta Ward

Member of the Ōta Ward Assembly
- In office April 1991 – June 2001

Personal details
- Born: 29 June 1958 (age 68) Shinagawa, Tokyo, Japan
- Party: Independent (2001–2005; 2023–present)
- Other political affiliations: Liberal Democratic (1991–2001; 2005–2023)
- Education: Nihon University
- Occupation: Politician
- Website: https://akimasa.info/

Akimasa Suzuki (鈴木 晶雅, Suzuki Akimasa; born 29 June 1958) is a Japanese politician who is the Mayor of Ōta, a Special ward of Tokyo, since April 2023. A former member of the Tokyo Metropolitan Assembly, Suzuki was chairman of the Special Committee on Budget and Chairman of the General Affairs Committee.

== Early life ==
Suzuki was born in Shinagawa, Tokyo. He graduated from Tokyo Metropolitan Omori High School and Nihon University Faculty of Law, Department of Political Science and Economics.

== Political career ==
=== Early years ===
Suzuki served as first secretary to House of Representatives member and future Tokyo Governor Shintaro Ishihara. Suzuki ran for the Ota Ward Assembly election in 1991 as a member of the Liberal Democratic Party, and was elected. He was then re-elected twice.

=== Tokyo Metropolitan Assembly ===
In June 2001, Suzuki left the LDP to run as an independent candidate in the Tokyo Metropolitan Assembly election, but was defeated. In April 2003, he once again ran for the Assembly's vacant seat, and was elected. Suzuki was re-elected in 2005, 2009, and the 2013 elections after re-joining the LDP, but lost in 2017. In 2020, Suzuki ran for a vacant seat in the Assembly after Yanagase Hirofumi's resignation and was elected.

=== Mayor of Ōta ===
In March 2023, Suzuki announced his candidacy for the Ōta Ward Mayoral election and resigned as a member of the Tokyo Metropolitan Assembly on the following month. Although Suzuki ran as an independent, his candidacy was backed by the Liberal Democratic Party and Komeito. He was successfully elected, defeating opposition-backed candidate Ai Mori. His term began on April 27, 2023.
