= Tokyo Port Wild Bird Park =

Park in Japan

- 東京港野鳥公園
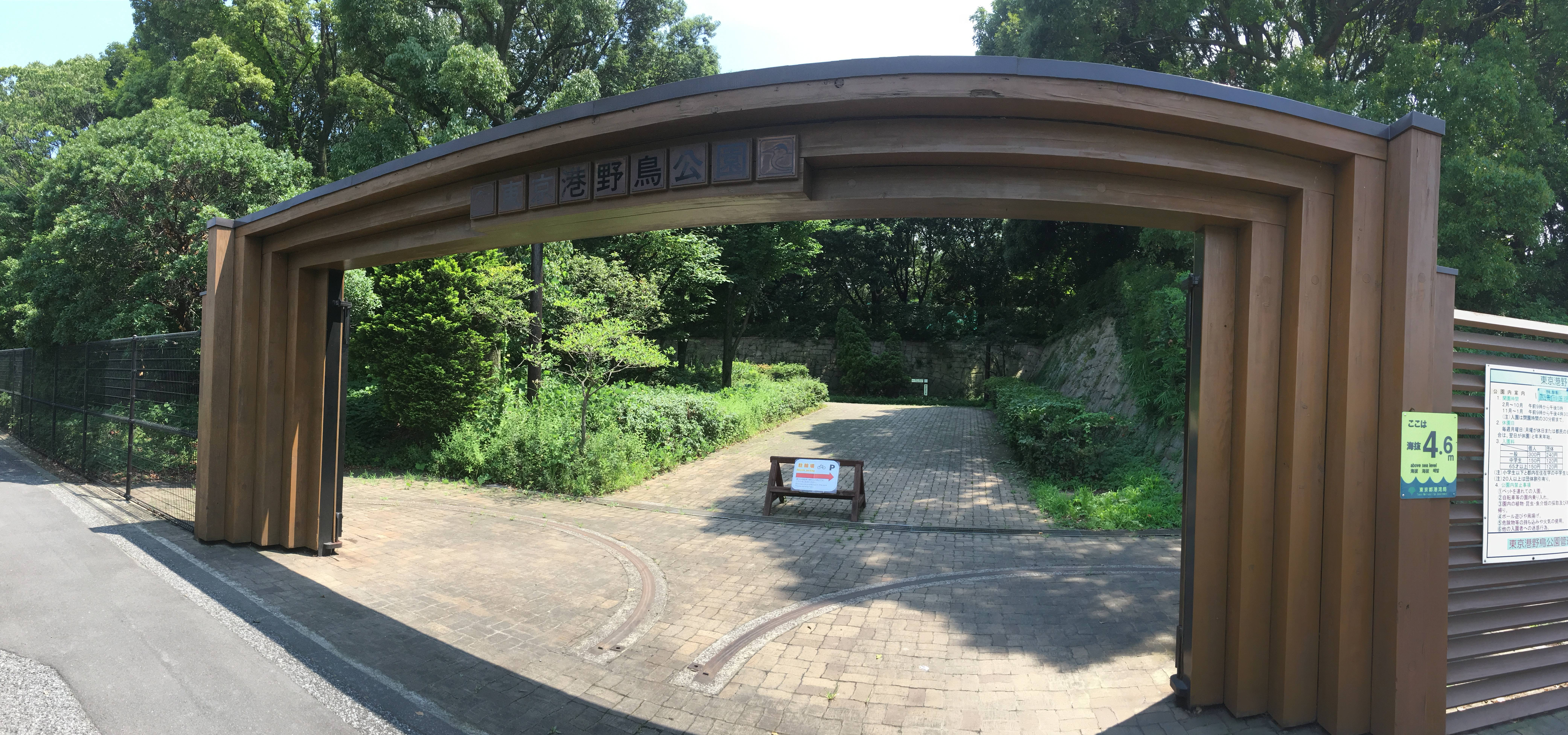
- Entrance, 2018
- Interactive map of Tokyo Port Wild Bird Park
- Location: 3-1 Tokai Ōta-ku, Tokyo, Japan 143-0001
- Coordinates: 35°35′2.3″N 139°45′38.35″E
- Area: 365,834.65m^{2} (including 121,444.55m^{2} of water area)
- Opened: 1 April 1978
- Website: http://www.wildbirdpark.jp/en/index.html

Tokyo Port Wild Bird Park (東京港野鳥公園, tōkyōkō yachō kōen) is a park and nature reserve located in Ōta Ward, Tokyo. The park was created on reclaimed land after local residents campaigned for its conservation, and comprises 36 hectares in area. It receives around 50,000 visitors annually.

According to their website, 237 species of birds have been recorded in the park since 1990 (as of March 2023), and around 120 are observed annually. The park includes brackish and freshwater ponds, streams, forests, and grassy fields. Varieties of crabs and insects can also be observed there.

On the edge of the Port of Tokyo, the park sits directly north of Ōta Market. It is surrounded by highways like the Bayshore Route and other parts of the Shuto Expressway. The park is under the jurisdiction of the Tokyo Port Authority, and its dedicated manager is the Tokyo Port Wild Bird Park Group (comprising Tokyo Port Terminal Corporation and the Wild Bird Society of Japan). Every year in May and November, the Tokyo Port Wild Bird Park Festival is held there.

== History ==
Yoshimaro Yamashina wrote the book "Countries where Birds Decrease and Countries where they Increase" (鳥の減る国ふえる国) in 1967, introducing the concept of bird sanctuaries to Japan. As a result, the vast majority of bird sanctuaries in the country were established over the following two decades. Since the park opened its first phase in 1978, it is considered a relatively early example of waterfront park development for the period.

From 1966 to 1970, the Tokyo Port Authority reclaimed the land where the park and Ōta Market sit today, originally for use as the new location of Tsukiji Market. After the land reclamation, the accumulation of rainwater in ponds and the growth of grasslands attracted fish, crabs, insects, and wild birds. Local people began to visit the area to watch the birds, and soon local residents launched a nature conservation movement around 1973. Recognizing the importance of Tokyo Bay as a stopover for migratory birds, the Tokyo Metropolitan Government decided to establish sanctuaries (protected areas for wild birds) off the shore of Kasai and in the Jōnan area.

In 1978, the park was founded as Oi Bird Park or Oi Pier 7 Park (Japanese: 大井第七ふ頭公園), with an area of 3.2 hectares centered around where the West Freshwater Pond is now. The name of the park was changed to its current name, Tokyo Port Wild Bird Park, in 1983.

Since the Ōta Market space only took up 38.6 hectares of land, and due to campaigning from citizens, the park was able to expand to 24.9 hectares of wetlands and forest and open a nature center in 1989.

On June 17, 2000, the park became part of the East Asian-Australasian Flyway Network, an important international flyway for migratory shorebirds. This gained the park international recognition as a habitat for sandpipers and plovers.

As part of the Metropolitan Government's efforts to restore tidal flats, the park was expanded by 11 hectares on April 1, 2018, and currently comprises 36 hectares in total.

== Facilities ==
The environment of the park is not naturally occurring wetland or tidal flats, but is artificial, created to replace habitats lost due to construction.

Admission tickets can be purchased from automated machines located at the management office. The park is divided into an eastern area (East Park) and a western area (West Park) by an underpass with roads and the Tōkaidō Freight Line running through the middle. To move from one side to another, the wheelchair-accessible bridge Sandpiper Bridge (いそしぎ橋) is available. Restrooms are available in both areas.

The park contains three main ponds (the East and West Freshwater Ponds and the Tidal Pond) and four observation huts with telescopes, as well as the Nature Center, the Ecology Education Center, and the East Observation Blind.

=== Eastern area ===
The East Freshwater Pond, the Tidal Pond, and the Maehama Tidal Flats are located in the eastern area of the park. The East Observation Blind overlooks the freshwater pond, which is designed to catch rainwater through an underground piping system. Two observation huts are near the Tidal Pond. Near the outskirts of the park, there is an observation blind for the tidal flats, as well.

The Nature Center is located in between the two ponds, and overlooks both of them. The first floor houses an exhibit, a library corner, and vending machines for beverages, while the second floor has telescopes available for free use. The basement level includes an exhibition space for marine debris and the "Gata-gata Walk" (ガタガタウォーク), a path that allows visitors to observe creatures such as crabs on the mudflats at close range.

=== Western area ===
The entrances and parking are in the western area, as well as the management offices and an open lawn. Free binoculars are available for loan at the management office, but the number is limited.

The West Freshwater Pond, also designed to catch freshwater, was the first created in the park. It has two observation blinds, and the Ecology Education Center is located near it.

== Visitor Information ==
The park is open 9:00 a.m.–5:00 p.m. from February to October, and 9:00 a.m.–4:30 p.m. from November to January. The park is closed every Monday and New Year's Day, and if a national holiday falls on a Monday the following Tuesday is closed.

Free parking is available for 23 cars on weekdays and Saturday mornings, and 40 cars on Sundays, holidays, and Saturdays from 12:00 a.m.–5:00 p.m. The park's website recommends using public transportation, as parking space is limited.

According to the website, it is a five minute ride from Haneda International Airport on the Tokyo Monorail to Ryūtsū Center Station, and the park is a fifteen minute walk from the station.
