= Hasunuma Station =

Railway station in Tokyo, Japan

Coordinates: 35°33′50″N 139°42′31″E

Hasunuma Station 蓮沼駅

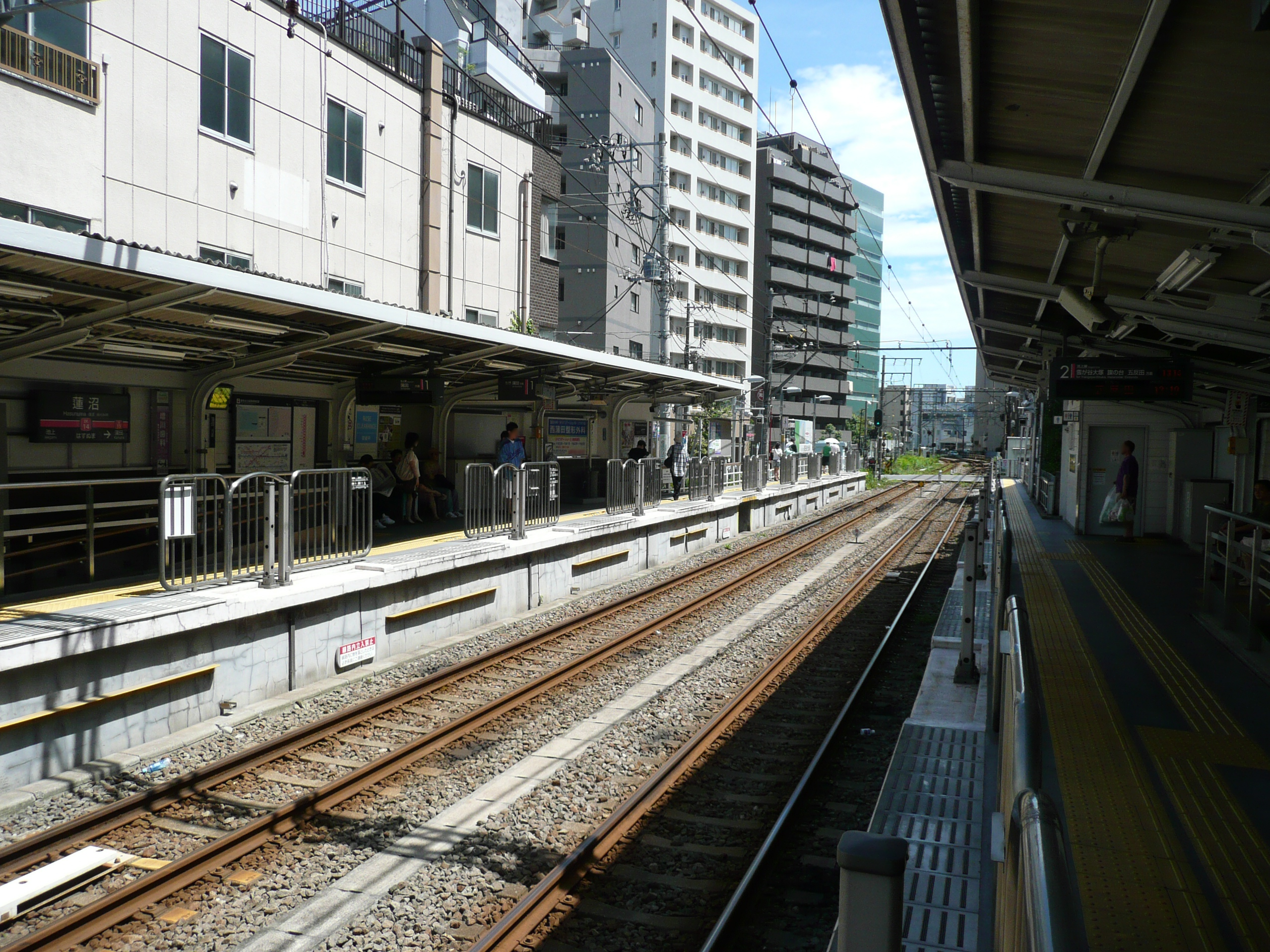
- Platforms

General information
- Location: 7-17-1 Nishikamata, Ōta Ward, Tokyo; Japan
- Operator: Tōkyū Railways
- Line: Ikegami Line
- Platforms: 2 side platforms
- Tracks: 2
- Connections: Bus stop

Construction
- Structure type: At grade

Other information
- Station code: IK14

History
- Opened: 6 October 1922; 103 years ago

Services
Preceding station	Tōkyū Railways	Following station
Kamata Terminus	Ikegami Line	Ikegami towards Gotanda
Location
- Location within Special wards of Tokyo Location within Tokyo Bay and Bōsō Peninsula Location within Tokyo Location within Japan

Hasunuma Station (蓮沼駅, Hasunuma-eki) is a Tokyo Kyuko Electric Railway Ikegami Line station located in Ōta, Tokyo.

== Station layout ==
The station has two ground-level side platforms.

1	■ Ikegami Line	Kamata
2	■ Ikegami Line	Yukigaya-Ōtsuka, Hatanodai, Gotanda

== Bus service ==
Hasunuma Station bus stop is served by Tokyu Bus routes to Kamata Station, Ōimachi Station, Ikegami Garage, Shinagawa Station, Rokugōdote Station and Den-en-chōfu Station.

== History ==
The station was opened by Ikegami Electric Railway in October 1922.
