= Kugahara Station (Tokyo) =

Railway station in Tokyo, Japan

Coordinates: 35°34′46″N 139°41′08″E

Kugahara Station 久が原駅

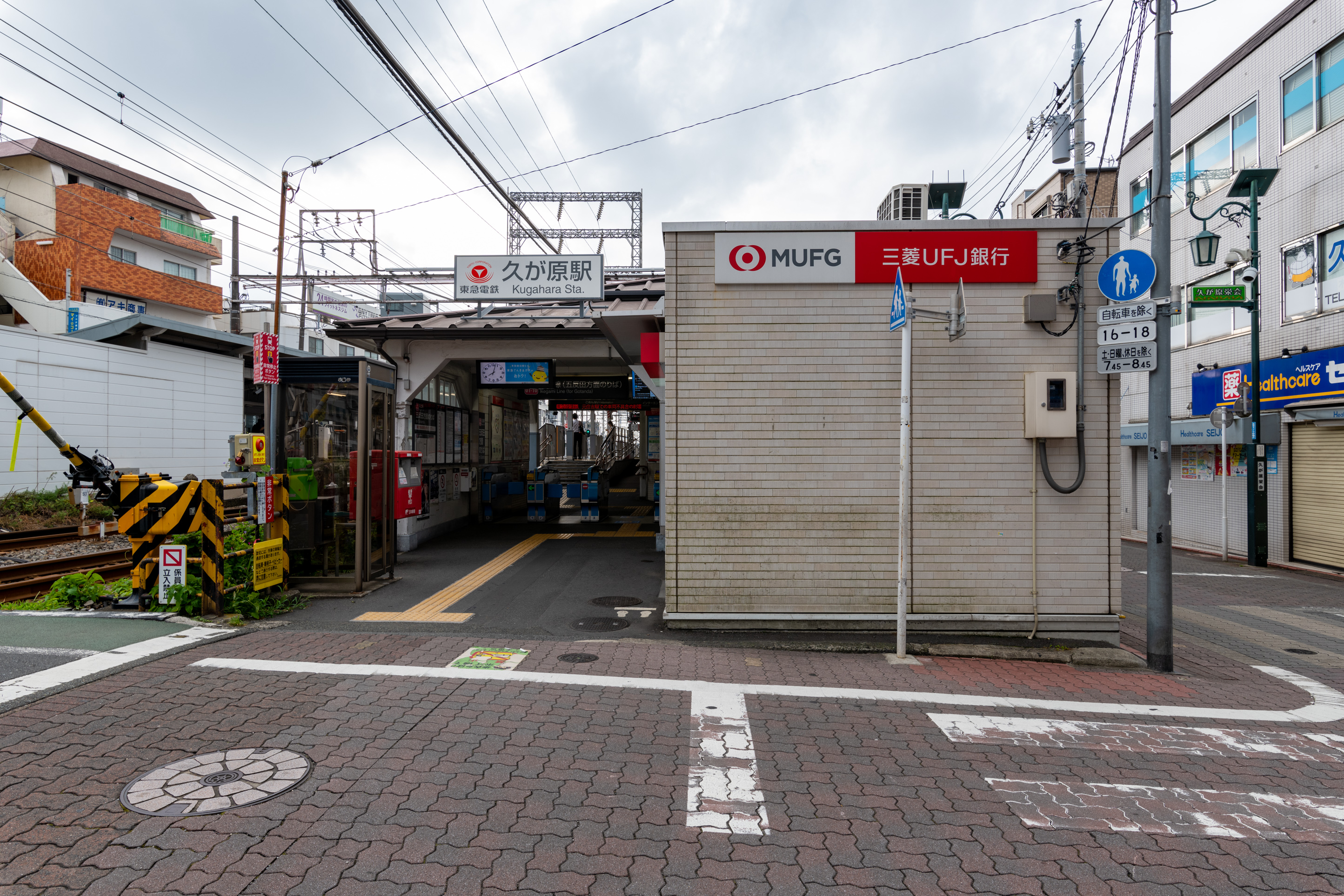
- Station entrance

General information
- Location: 2-6-10 Minamikyugahara, Ōta Ward, Tokyo; Japan
- Operator: Tōkyū Railways
- Line: Ikegami Line
- Platforms: 2 side platforms
- Tracks: 2

Construction
- Structure type: At grade

Other information
- Station code: IK11

History
- Opened: 4 May 1923; 103 years ago
- Former names: Suehiro (1923-1928); Higashi-Chōfu (1928-1936)

Passengers
- 2021: 13,325 daily

Services
Preceding station	Tōkyū Railways	Following station
Chidorichō towards Kamata	Ikegami Line	Ontakesan towards Gotanda
Location
- Location within Special wards of Tokyo Location within Tokyo Bay and Bōsō Peninsula Location within Tokyo Location within Japan

Kugahara Station (久が原駅, Kugahara-eki) is a railway station on the Tokyu Ikegami Line in Ōta, Tokyo, Japan, operated by the private railway operator Tokyu Corporation.

== Station layout ==
This station has two opposed side platforms serving two tracks.

=== Platforms ===
1	■ Tokyu Ikegami Line	for Ikegami and Kamata
2	■ Tokyu Ikegami Line	for Hatanodai and Gotanda

== Traffic ==
In 2014, 14,910 passengers per day started or ended travel at the station in average. In 2023, this number increased slightly to an average of 15,247 passengers per day.

== History ==
The station opened on May 4, 1923, as Suehiro Station (末広駅) on the Ikegami Electric Railway. In April 1928, it was renamed Higashi-Chōfu Station (東調布駅). On January 1, 1936, it was renamed Kugahara Station (久ヶ原駅), and on January 20, 1966, the Japanese name was changed to the present-day form.

== See also ==
- List of railway stations in Japan
