= Ontakesan Station =

Railway station in Tokyo, Japan

Ontakesan Station 御嶽山駅

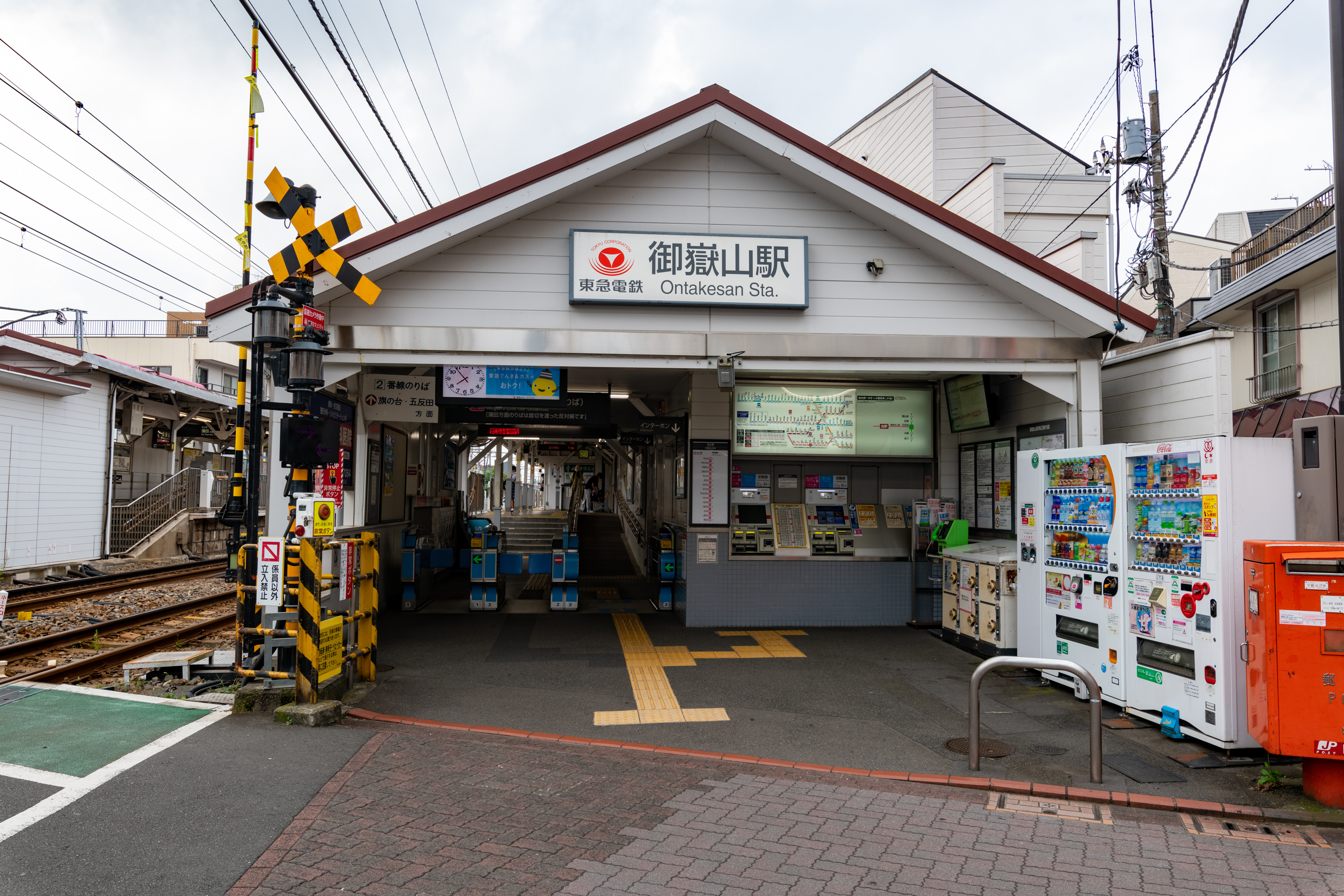
- The Gotanda-bound platform entrance in August 2021

General information
- Location: 32-17 Kitaminemachi, Ōta Ward, Tokyo 145-0073; Japan
- Coordinates: 35°35′07″N 139°40′57″E
- Operator: Tōkyū Railways
- Line: Ikegami Line
- Distance: 6.4 km (4.0 mi) from Gotanda
- Platforms: 2 side platforms
- Tracks: 2

Construction
- Structure type: At grade

Other information
- Station code: IK10
- Website: Official website

History
- Opened: 4 May 1923; 103 years ago
- Former names: Ontakesan-mae Station (until 1933)

Passengers
- FY2011: 23,588 daily

Services
Preceding station	Tōkyū Railways	Following station
Kugahara towards Kamata	Ikegami Line	Yukigaya-ōtsuka towards Gotanda
Location
- Location within Special wards of Tokyo Location within Tokyo Bay and Bōsō Peninsula Location within Tokyo Location within Japan

Ontakesan Station (御嶽山駅, Ontakesan-eki) is a railway station on the Tokyu Ikegami Line in Ōta, Tokyo, Japan, operated by the private railway operator Tokyu Corporation.

== Lines ==
Ontakesan Station is served by the 10.9 km Tokyu Ikegami Line between Gotanda and Kamata, and lies 6.4 km from the starting point of the line at Gotanda.

== Station layout ==
The station has two ground-level (partly elevated) side platforms serving two tracks.

=== Platforms ===
1	■ Tokyu Ikegami Line	for Ikegami and Kamata
2	■ Tokyu Ikegami Line	for Hatanodai and Gotanda

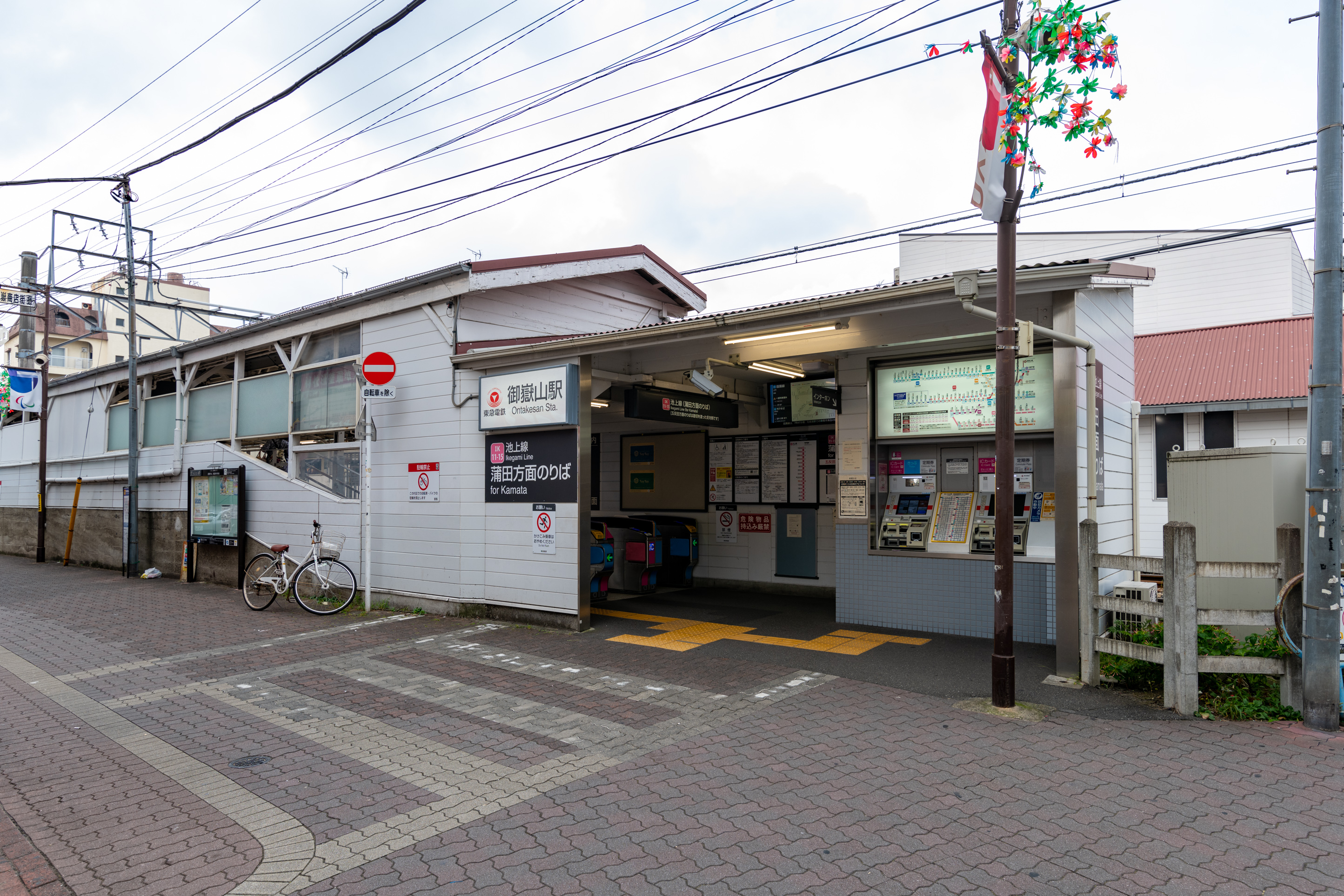
The Kamata-bound platform entrance in August 2021

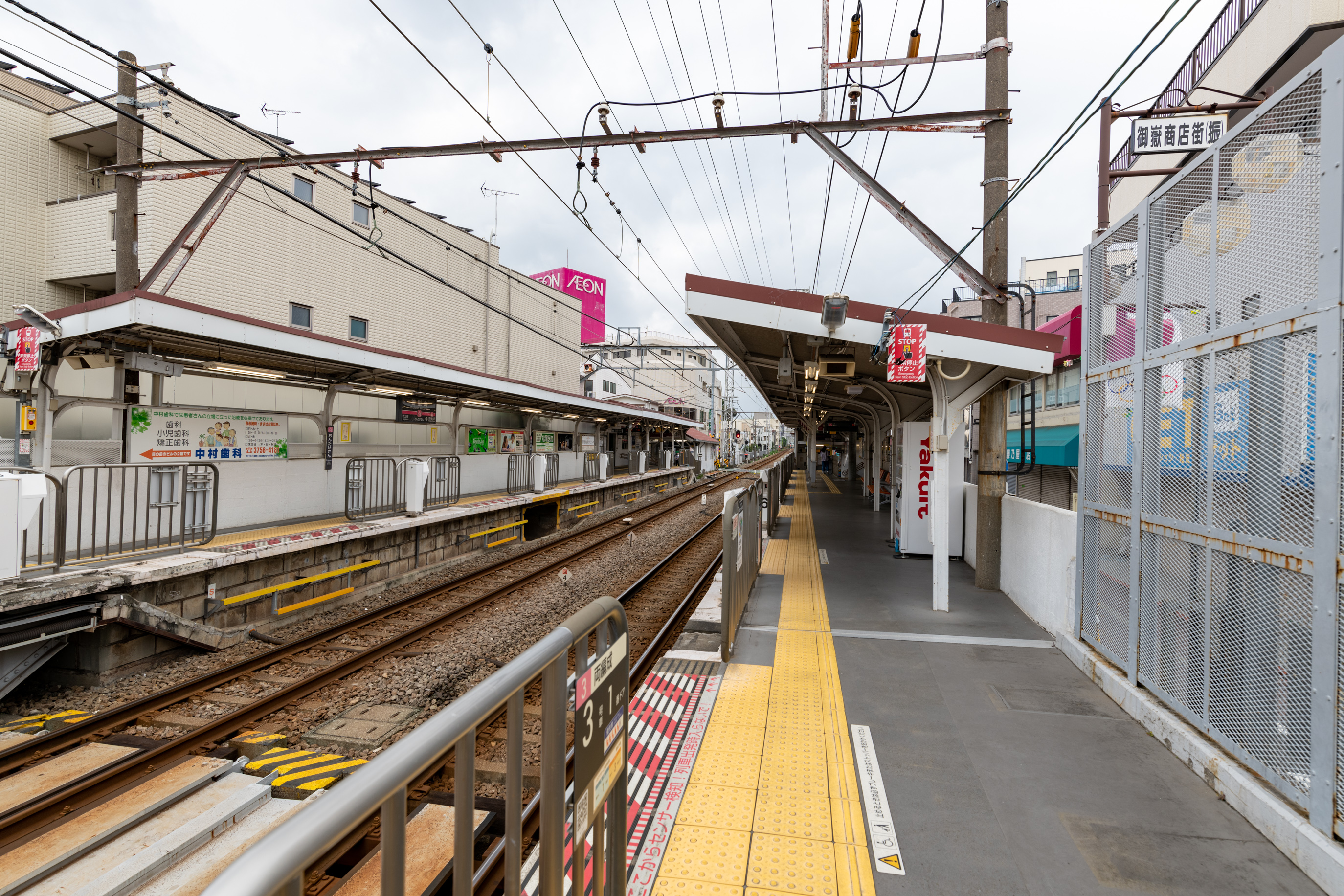
The platforms in August 2021

== History ==
The station opened on 4 May 1923 as Ontakesan-mae Station (御嶽山前駅). It was renamed Otakesan on 1 June 1933.

== Passenger statistics ==
In fiscal 2011, the station was used by an average of 23,588 passengers daily.

== Surrounding area ==
- Den Enchofu High School

== See also ==
- List of railway stations in Japan
