= Tokyu 7600 series =

Japanese train type

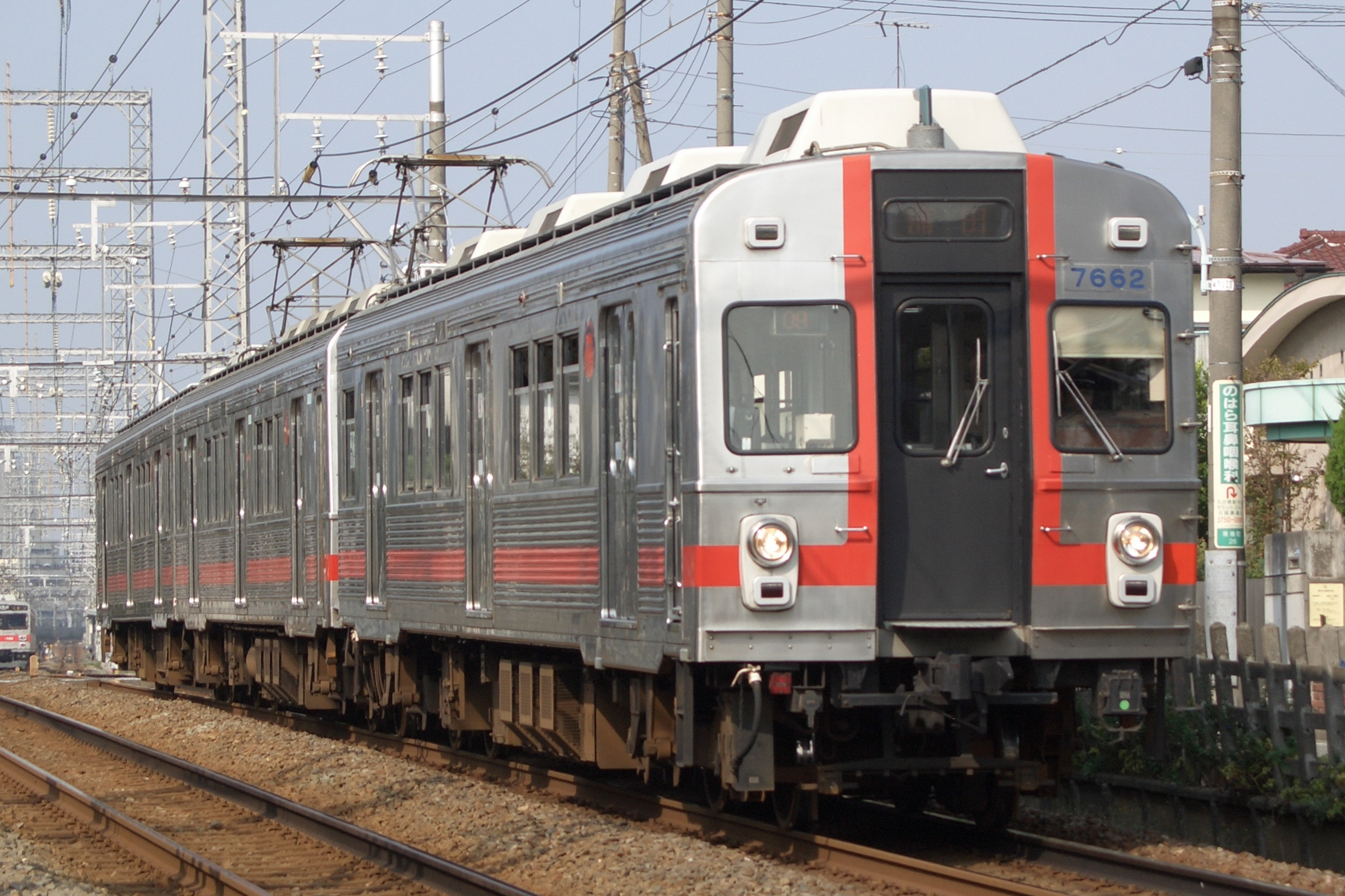
- A 7600 series EMU running between Kugahara Station and Ontakesan Station on the Tokyu Ikegami Line
- In service: May 1986 – February 2015
- Constructed: 1986–1990
- Entered service: 1 May 1986
- Number built: 3 sets (9 cars)
- Number in service: None
- Number preserved: None
- Number scrapped: 3 sets (9 cars)
- Formation: 3 cars per trainset
- Operators: Tokyu Corporation
- Lines served: Tokyu Tamagawa Line, Tokyu Ikegami Line

Specifications
- Car body construction: Stainless steel
- Car length: 18 m (59 ft 5/8 in)
- Doors: 3 pairs per side
- Traction system: Variable frequency (GTO)
- Electric system(s): 1,500 V DC Overhead line
- Current collection: Pantograph
- Track gauge: 1,067 mm (3 ft 6 in)

The Tokyu 7600 series (東急7600系, Tōkyū 7600-kei) was a commuter electric multiple unit (EMU) train type operated by the private railway operator Tokyu Corporation in Japan from 1 May 1986 until 10 February 2015. They were all rebuilt from 7200 series trains dating from 1967 to 1972.

== Design ==
Cars were 18 m (59 ft 1 in) long, all made of stainless steel, with longitudinal seating. Two three-car sets were formed in 1986, followed by a third set in 1990.

== Operations ==
These trains initially operated on the Mekama Line and Ōimachi Line. They were later concentrated on the Ikegami Line and used with the 7200 series. The 7600 series trains were used on the Tamagawa Line and Ikegami Line. A special farewell event for the 7600 series was held on 7 February 2015, and they were finally withdrawn on 10 February the same year. No 7600 series cars have been preserved.

== Formations ==
As of 1 April 2014, two three-car sets were in service, formed as shown below, with two motored ("M") cars and one non-powered trailer ("T") car, and car 1 at the Gotanda/Tamagawa end.

Car No.	1	2	3
Designation	Tc	M	Mc
Numbering	7600	7680	7660

Car 2 had two lozenge-type pantographs.

== Livery variations ==
From November 2014, set 7601 was returned to service after overhaul in the plain unpainted stainless steel livery formerly carried by the 7200 series trains.

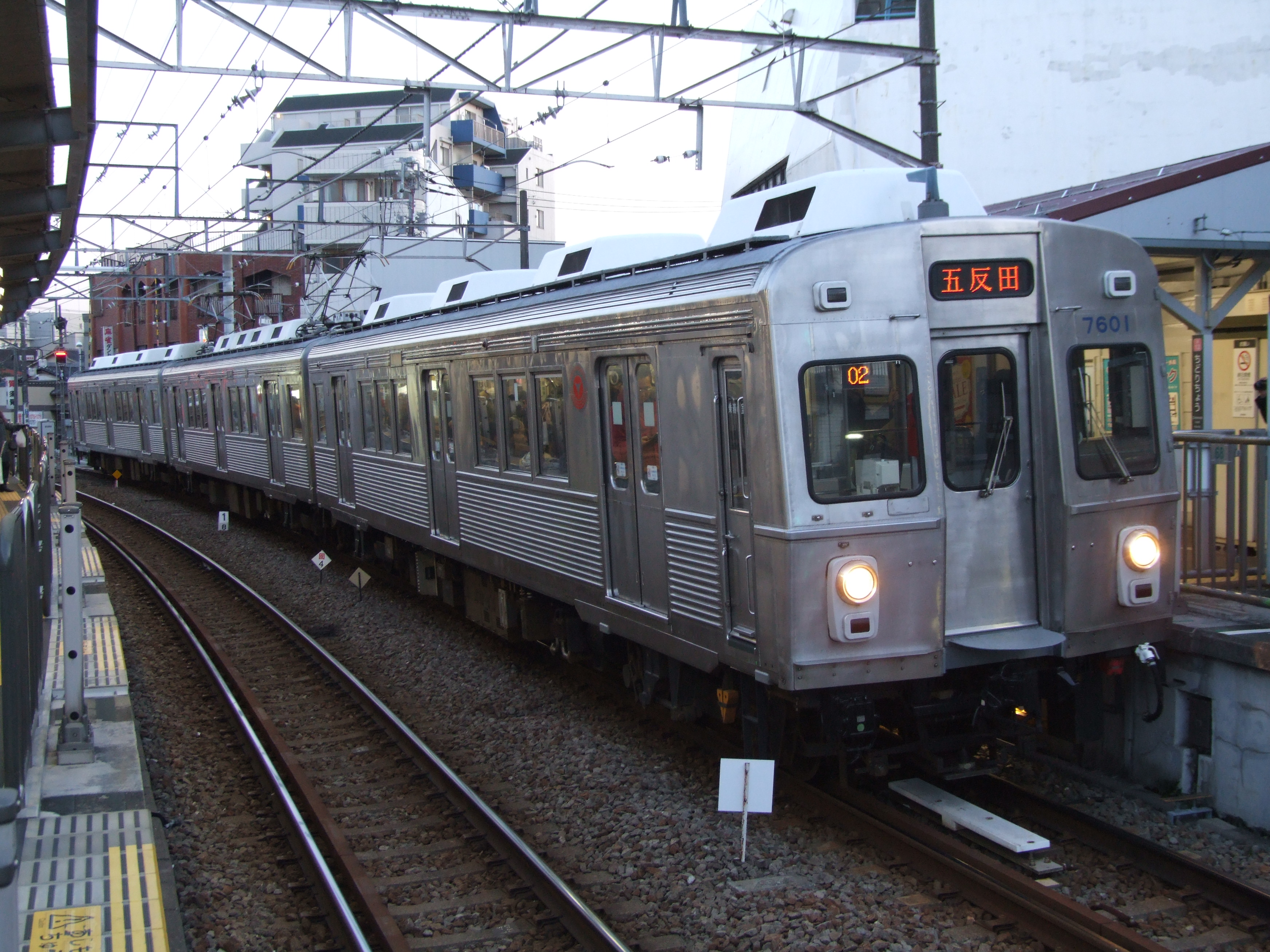
Set 7601 in unpainted stainless steel livery
