= Train automatic stopping controller =

Type of train protection system in Japan

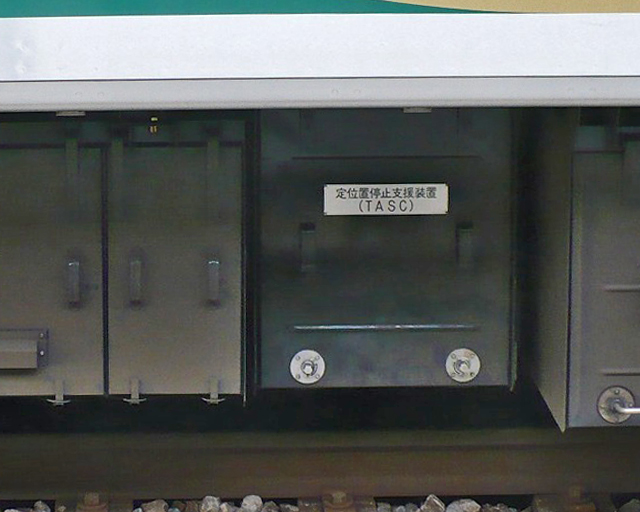
TASC unit beneath a Tōkyū 7000 series EMU

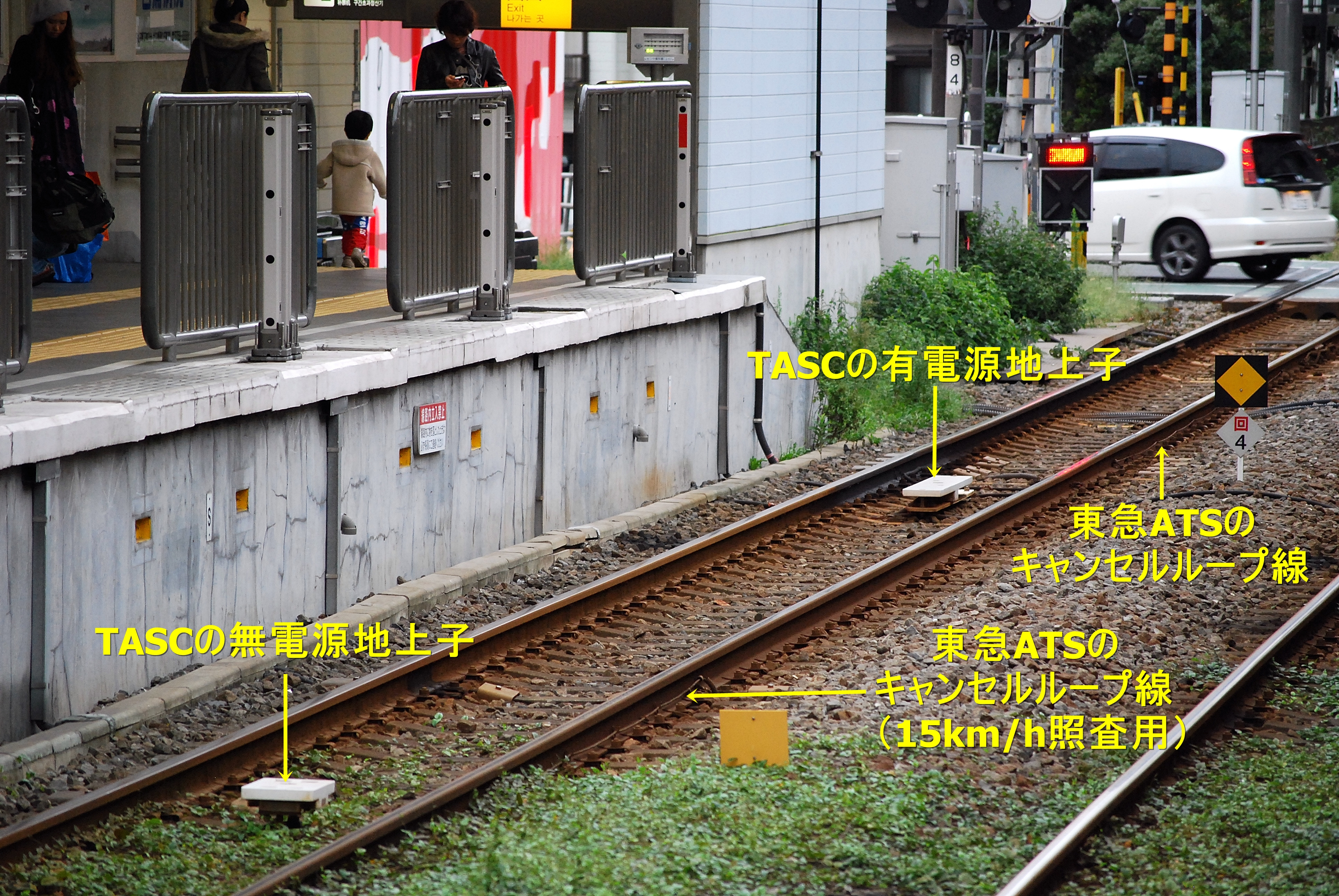
TASC balises at a railway station in Japan

Train automatic stopping/stop-position controller (定位置停止装置, Teiichi Teishi Sōchi) (TASC) is the name of a train protection system/automated stopping aid currently used only in Japan. It allows trains equipped with TASC to stop automatically at stations without the need for the train operator to operate the brakes manually, preventing stopping errors and SPADs. TASC is also compatible with automatic train control (ATC) and automatic train operation (ATO), where in the latter case it acts as its auto-braking function.

== History ==
The first incarnation of TASC was originally developed in the 1950s and 1960s as a way of ensuring that trains stop properly at stations, although problems with brake responsiveness, among other issues with the existing technology of that time, meant that it was never put into practical use. From the 1970s, technological improvements in computing and railway technology, especially the advent of one-person operation and automated guideway transit (AGT) systems and more recently, platform screen doors, made TASC increasingly viable both as a train protection system and as a precursor or complement to railway automation. The first full-scale implementation of TASC was on the Tokyo Metro Ginza Line, the oldest subway line in Japan, where it, along with a new CS-ATC cab signalling system, replaced the line's previous mechanically-operated automatic train stop (ATS) system in 1993, enabling a massive upgrade of the line's route capacity and frequency between trains.

== Usage ==
Examples of train lines that have TASC.

- Tokyo Metro Ginza Line (first TASC installation, since 1993)
- Tokyo Metro Marunouchi Line (including Hōnanchō branch; main line also enhanced with ATO since 2010)
- Tōkyū Meguro Line
- Tōkyū Ikegami Line
- Tōkyū Tamagawa Line
- Tokyu Toyoko Line
- Tōbu Tōjō Line (Ikebukuro, Wakōshi, Asaka, Asakadai, Shiki, and Kawagoe stations only)
- Aonami Line
- Osaka Metro Imazatosuji Line (since 2006), Midōsuji Line and Kita-Osaka Kyuko Railway (since 2021; concurrent with PSD retrofits)
- Seibu Yūrakuchō Line (at Kotake-mukaihara Station)
- Keihan Keishin Line (at Misasagi Station)
- Yamanote Line (since 2017; concurrent with PSD retrofits)
- Odakyū Odawara Line (from Shinjuku Station to Isehara Station, since January 2024)
