= 7600 =

7600 may refer to:

- The year 7600, in 8th millennium.
- 7600 Vacchi, a main belt asteroid
- Remington Model 7600 rifle

== Technology ==
- CDC 7600, a supercomputer
- Cisco 7600, a network router
- GeForce 7600 series, a line of graphics processing units from Nvidia
- Nokia 7600, a mobile phone released in 2003
- Power Macintosh 7600
- Radeon RX 7600 series, a line of graphics processing units from AMD
- RTM build number of Microsoft's Windows 7 operating system

== Transport ==
- Tokyu 7600 series, a Japanese train series
- Aviation Transponder code for Lost Communications.
