= Tokyu 7000 series =

Japanese train type

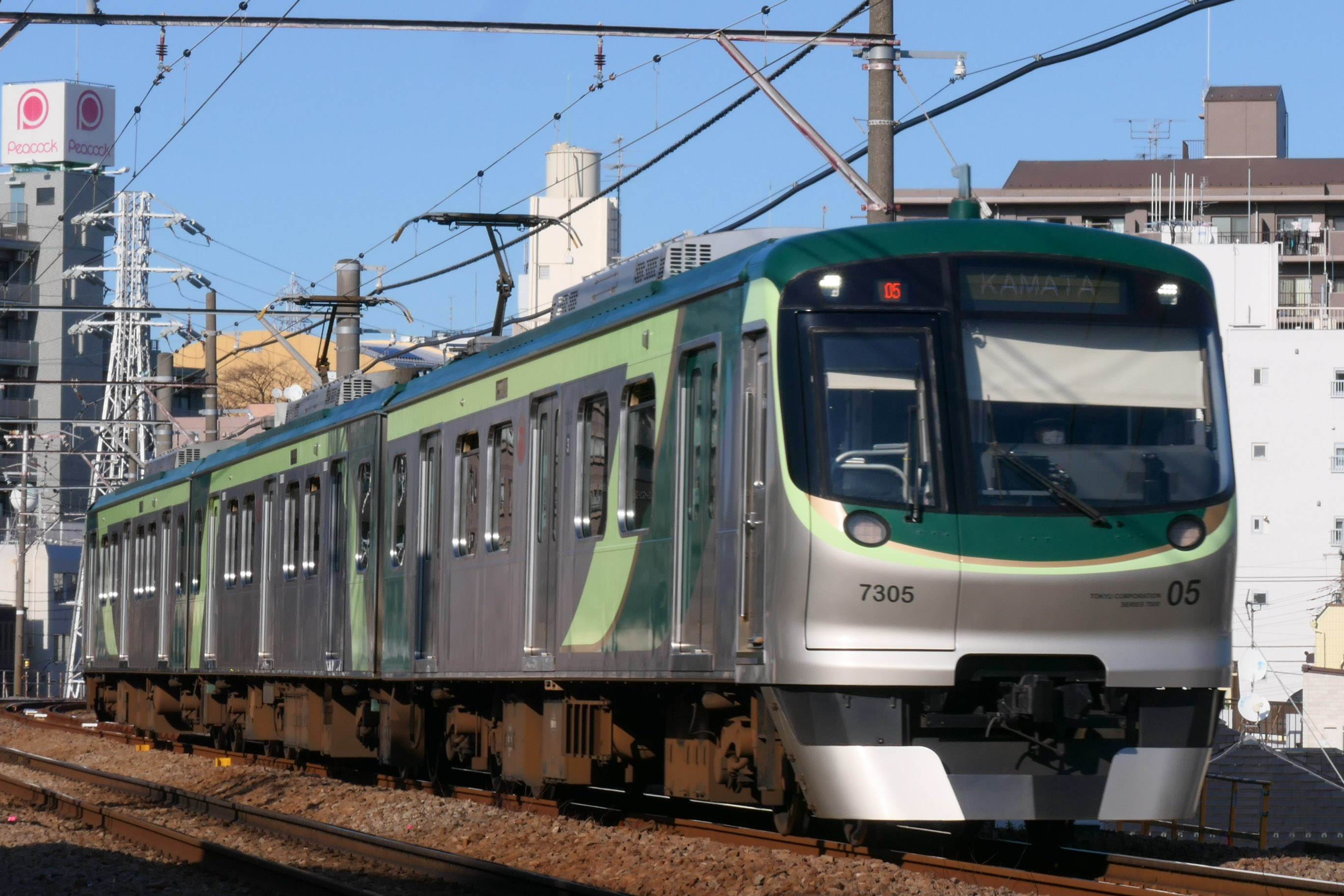
- 7000 series set 7105 on the Ikegami Line in March 2021
- Manufacturers: Tokyu Car Corporation, J-TREC
- Built at: Yokohama
- Constructed: 2007–2018
- Entered service: December 2007
- Number built: 45 vehicles (15 sets)
- Number in service: 45 vehicles (15 sets)
- Formation: 3 cars per trainset
- Fleet numbers: 7101–7115
- Capacity: 378 (133 seated)
- Operator: Tokyu Corporation
- Depot: Yukigaya
- Lines served: Ikegami Line; Tokyu Tamagawa Line

Specifications
- Car body construction: Stainless steel
- Car length: 18,100 mm (59 ft 4 5/8 in) (end cars); 18,000 mm (59 ft 5/8 in) (intermediate car)
- Width: 2,800 mm (9 ft 2 1/4 in)
- Height: 4,050 mm (13 ft 3 1/2 in)
- Doors: 3 pairs per side
- Maximum speed: 85 km/h (53 mph)
- Power output: 190 kW (250 hp) x 8
- Acceleration: 3.3 km/(h⋅s) (2.1 mph/s)
- Deceleration: 3.5 km/(h⋅s) (2.2 mph/s) (service); 4.5 km/(h⋅s) (2.8 mph/s) (emergency)
- Electric systems: 1,500 V DC (overhead wire)
- Current collection: Pantograph
- Safety systems: Tokyu ATS, ATC-P, TASC
- Track gauge: 1,067 mm (3 ft 6 in)

The Tokyu 7000 series (東急7000系, Tōkyū 7000-kei) is an electric multiple unit (EMU) train type operated by the private railway operator Tokyu Corporation on the Ikegami and Tokyu Tamagawa lines in Japan since December 2007.

== Design ==
Based on the 5000 series design, cars are 18 metres long and have three sets of doors per side.

These trains use a Train Automatic Stopping Controller (TASC) system allowing them to stop automatically at all stations.

== Operations ==
The trains are primarily used on Ikegami Line and Tokyu Tamagawa Line services. Since 2019, they have occasionally been used to provide additional capacity on the Kodomonokuni Line during special events.

== Formation ==
As of 1 April 2019, the fleet consists of 15 three-car sets, 7101 to 7115, formed as follows.

	← Tamagawa, Gotanda Kamata →		
Designation	DeHa 7100 (Mc)	DeHa 7200 (M)	KuHa 7300 (Tc)
Weight (t)	31.2	34.1	26.8
Capacity (total/seated)	122/44	134/45	122/44
Numbering	7101 : 7115	7201 : 7215	7301 : 7315

Car 2 is fitted with two single-arm pantographs.

== Interior ==
Seating is predominantly arranged longitudinally, with some transverse seating bays in the centre car.

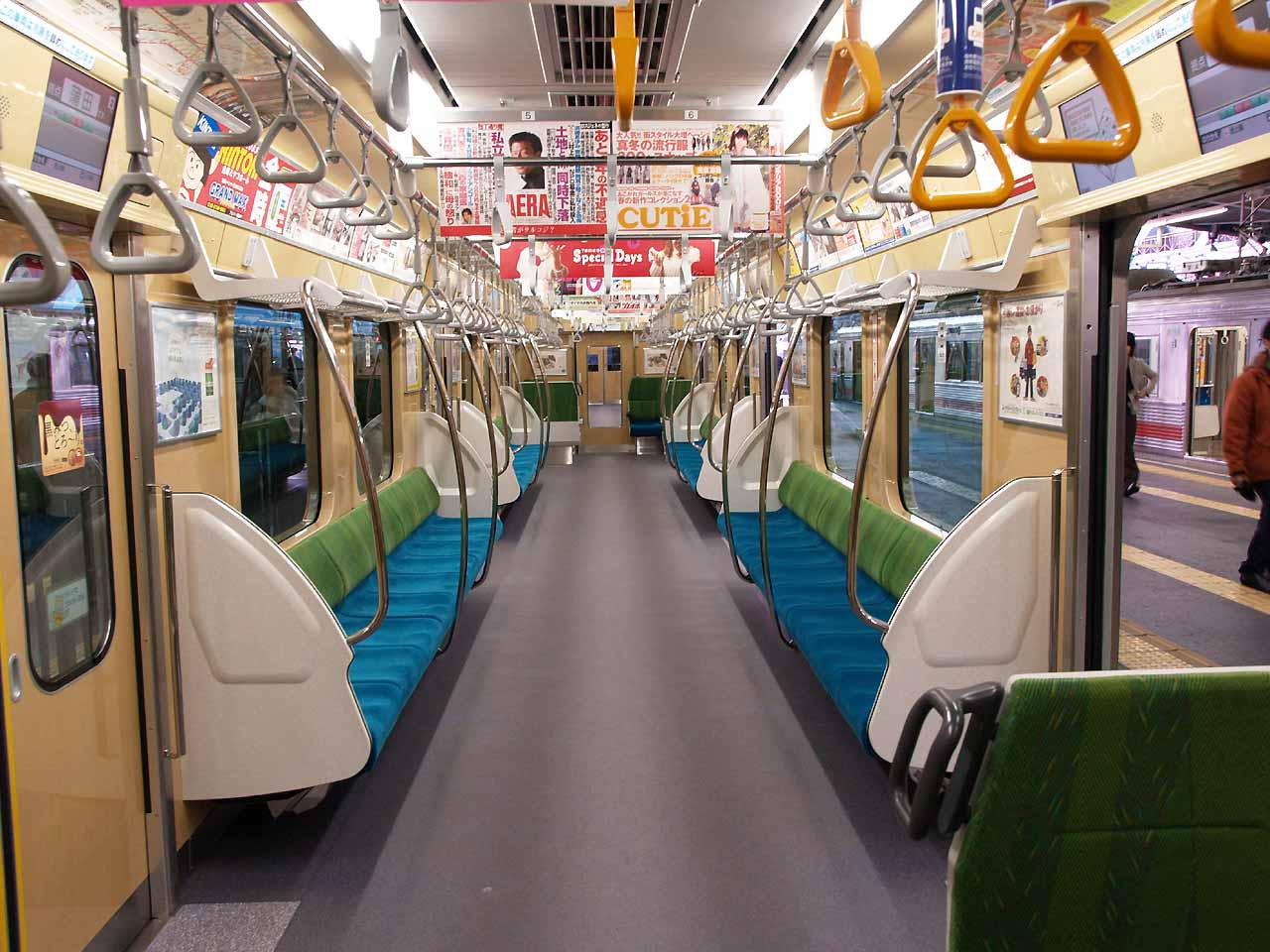
Interior view of centre car, showing longitudinal seating

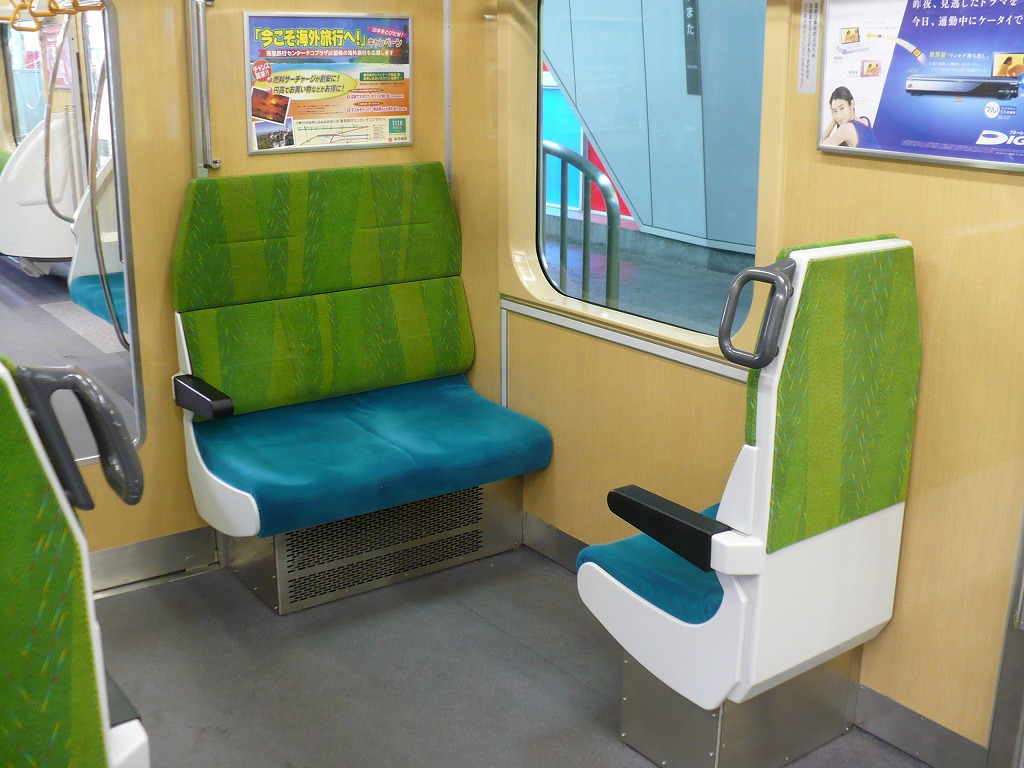
Transverse seating bays

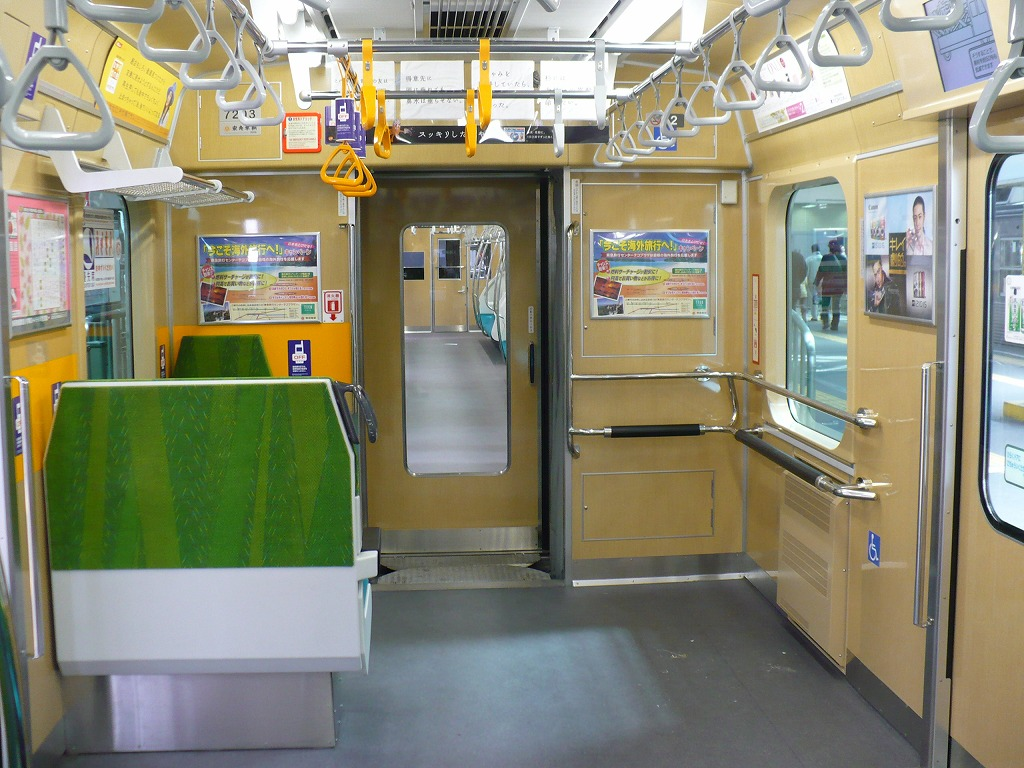
Transverse seating bay with wheelchair space

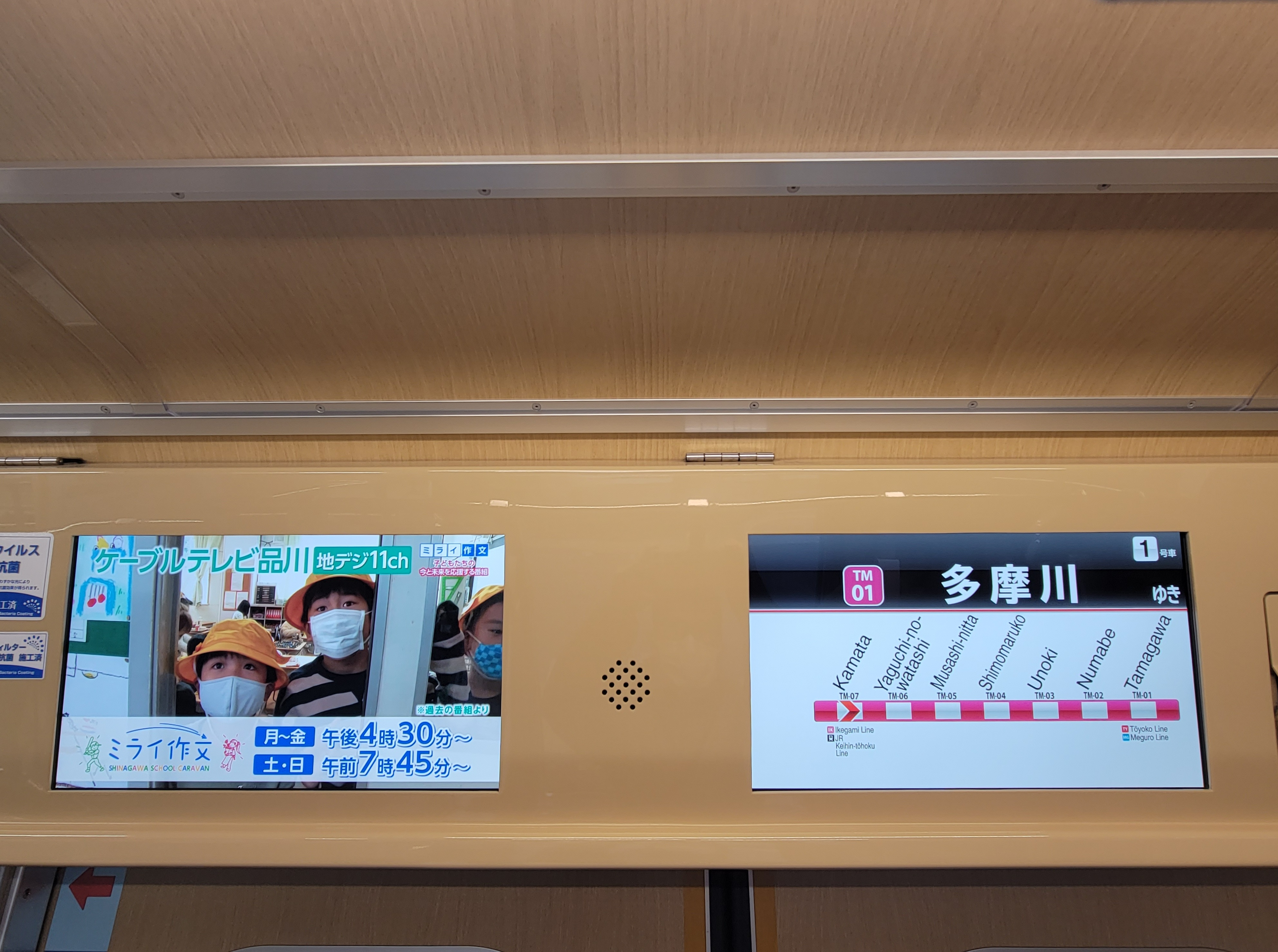
LCD passenger information display

== History ==
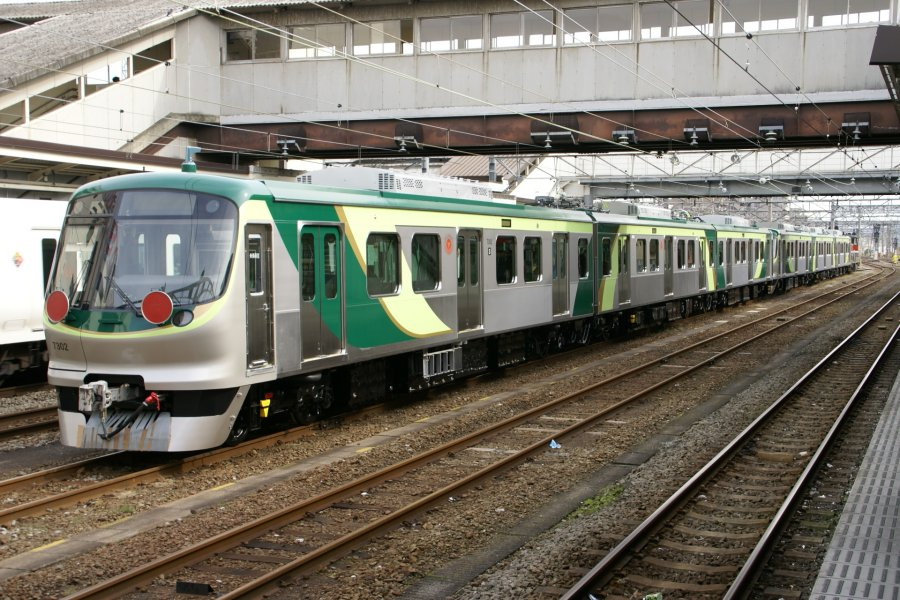
The first sets, 7101 and 7102, on delivery to Tokyu in November 2007

The first two three-car sets were delivered in November 2007.

Two sets, 7108 and 7109, were delivered from the J-TREC factory in Yokohama in November 2017.

Six additional sets, numbered 7110 to 7115, were delivered from the J-TREC factory in Yokohama in 2018.

== Special liveries ==
From 10 April 2022, two 7000 series sets are due to receive a special livery to commemorate the 100th anniversary of Tokyu Corporation's founding.
