= Ikegami Station =

Railway station in Tokyo, Japan

Coordinates: 35°34′19″N 139°42′10″E

Ikegami Station 池上駅

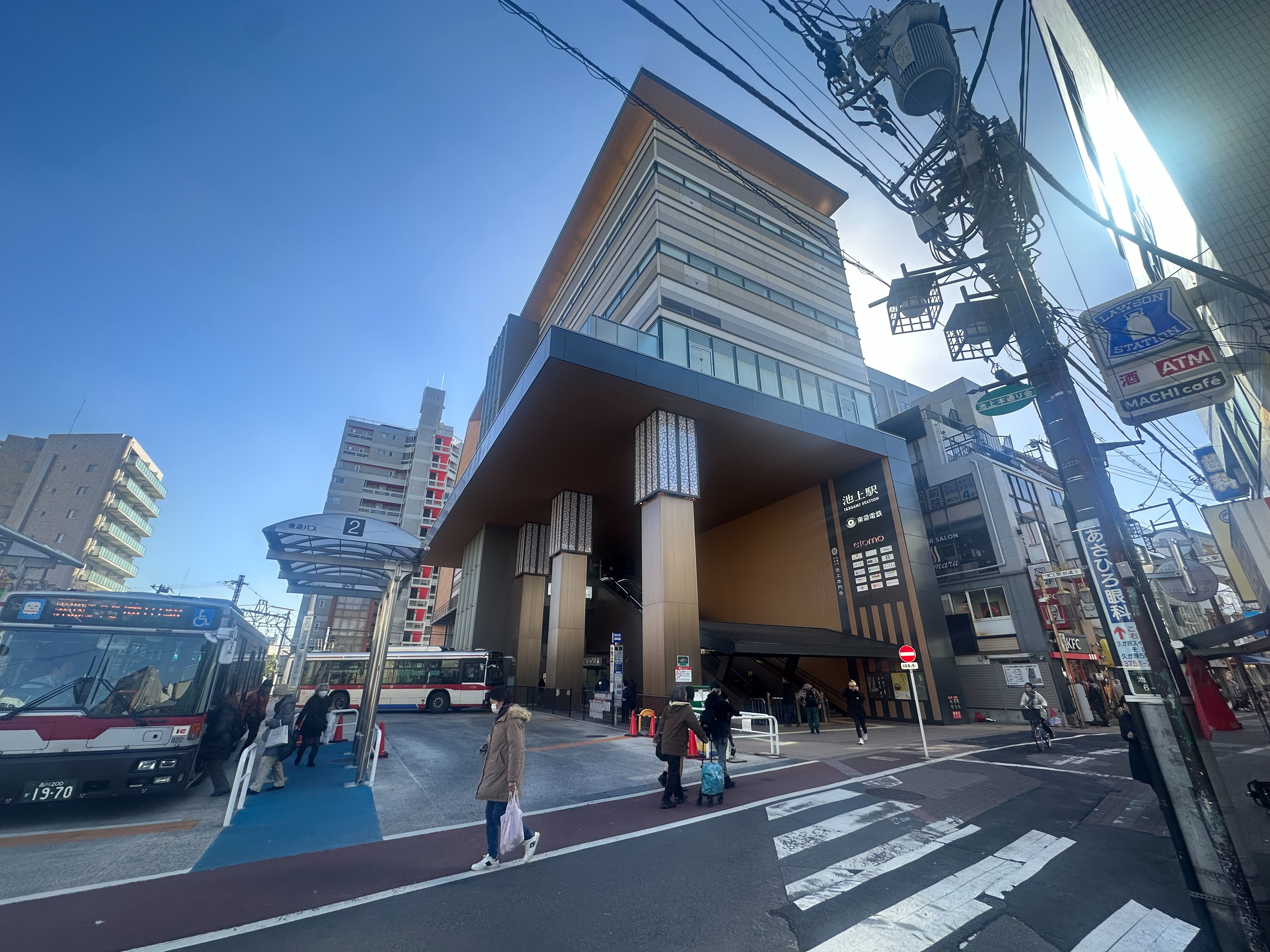
- North exit, 2024

General information
- Location: 6-3-10 Ikegami, Ōta, Tokyo （東京都大田区池上） Japan
- Operator: Tōkyū Railways
- Line: Ikegami Line
- Platforms: 2 side platforms
- Tracks: 2
- Connections: Bus terminal

Construction
- Structure type: At grade

Other information
- Station code: IK13

History
- Opened: 6 October 1922; 103 years ago

Services
| Preceding station | Tōkyū Railways | Following station |
|---|---|---|
| Hasunuma towards Kamata | Ikegami Line | Chidorichō towards Gotanda |
Location
- Location within Special wards of Tokyo Location within Tokyo Bay and Bōsō Peninsula Location within Tokyo Location within Japan

Ikegami Station (池上駅, Ikegami-eki) is a Tokyu Ikegami Line station in Ōta, Tokyo. It is close to Ikegami Honmon-ji.

== Station layout ==
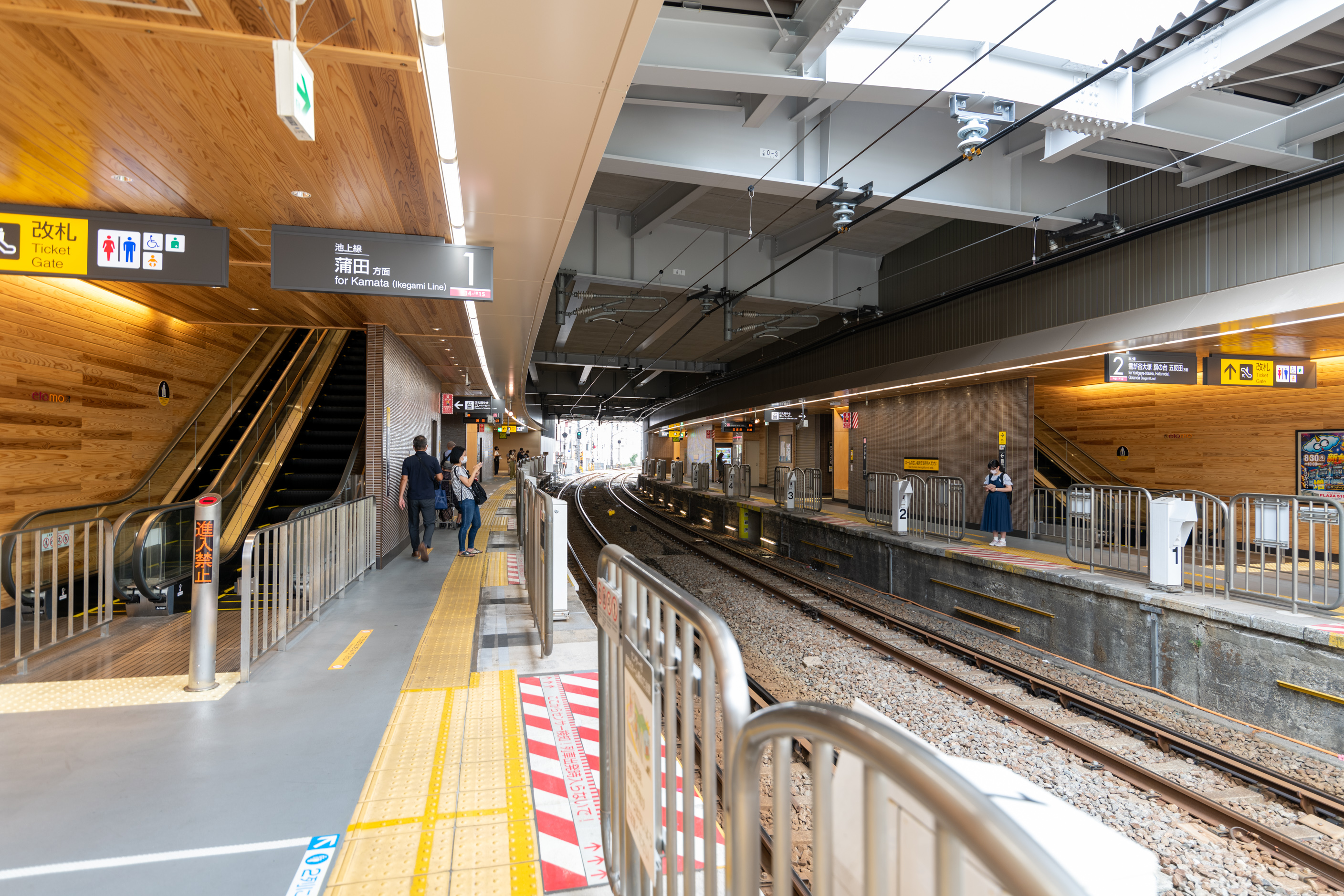
Ikegami Station Platform

Two ground-level side platforms.

| 1 | ■ Ikegami Line | Kamata |
| 2 | ■ Ikegami Line | Yukigaya-Ōtsuka, Hatanodai, Gotanda |

== Bus service ==
Ikegami Sta. mae (池上駅前, Ikegami eki mae) bus stop is served by Tokyu Bus services to Ōimachi Station, Ikegami Garage, Shinagawa Station, Ōmori Station, Ōmori Garage, Kamata Station, Rokugōdote Station, Senzokuike and Den-en-chōfu Station as well as the Kami-Ikegami loop service.

== History ==
The station was opened in October 1922 as a station of Ikegami Electric Railway.

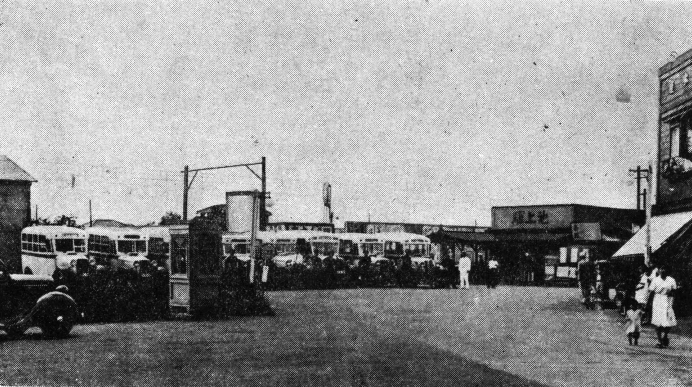
The station in the 1940.
