= Yukigaya-ōtsuka Station =

Railway station in Tokyo, Japan

Coordinates: 35°35′31″N 139°40′52″E

Yukigaya-ōtsuka Station 雪が谷大塚駅

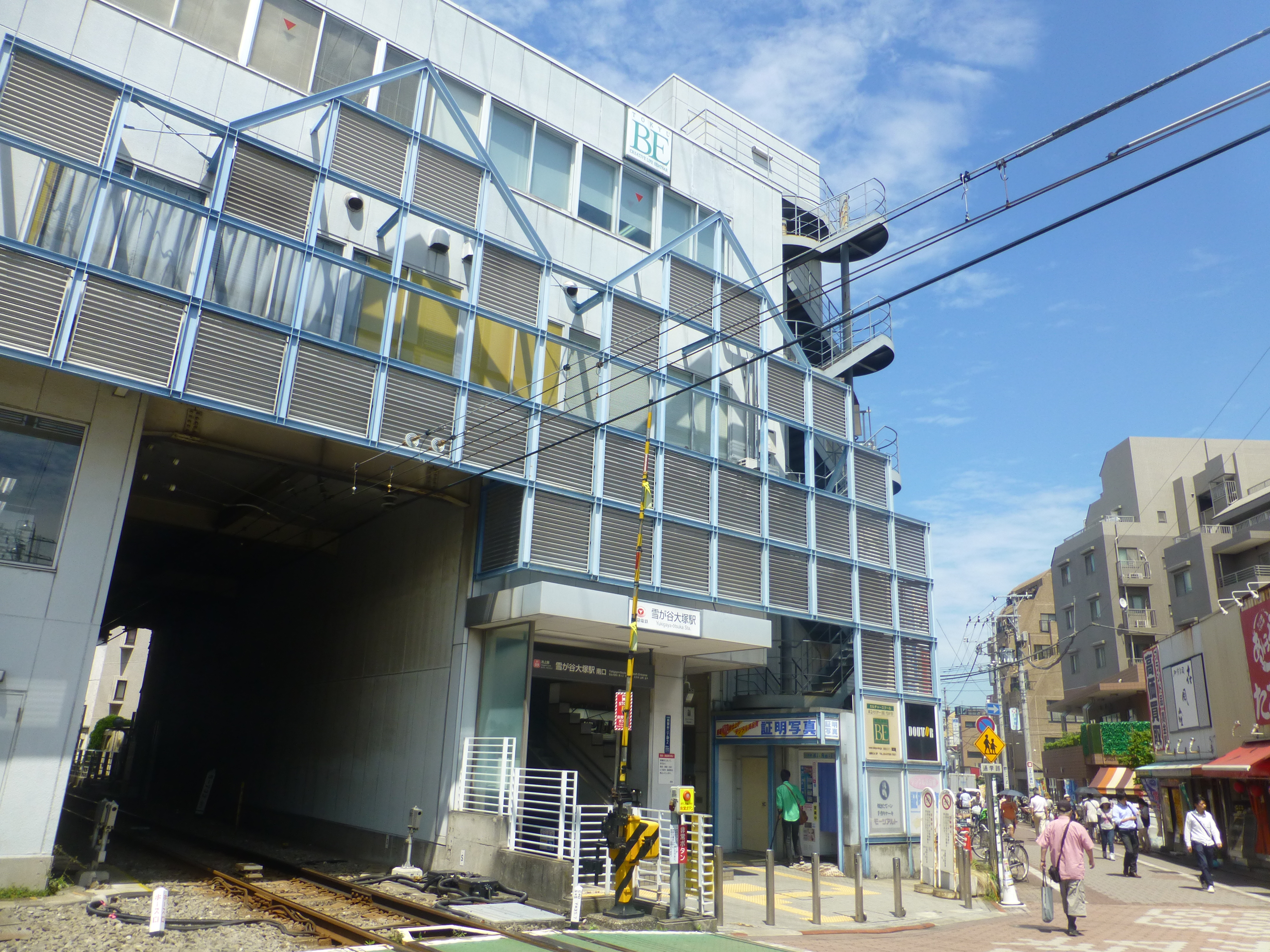
- Yukigaya-ōtsuka Station, 2016

General information
- Location: Minami-Yukigaya, Ota Ward, Tokyo （東京都大田区南雪谷） Japan
- Operator: Tōkyū Railways
- Line: Ikegami Line
- Platforms: 1 island platform
- Tracks: 2
- Connections: Bus stop

Construction
- Structure type: At grade

Other information
- Station code: IK09

History
- Opened: 1923 (former); 1933 (present)

Services
Preceding station	Tōkyū Railways	Following station
Ontakesan towards Kamata	Ikegami Line	Ishikawa-dai towards Gotanda
Location
- Location within Special wards of Tokyo Location within Tokyo Bay and Bōsō Peninsula Location within Tokyo Location within Japan

Yukigaya-ōtsuka Station (雪が谷大塚駅, Yukigaya-ōtsuka eki) is a station in southeast Tokyo, Japan. It is a located in Ōta Ward, about a 20-minute walk away from Tamagawa and a 30 minute-walk from Den-en-chōfu.

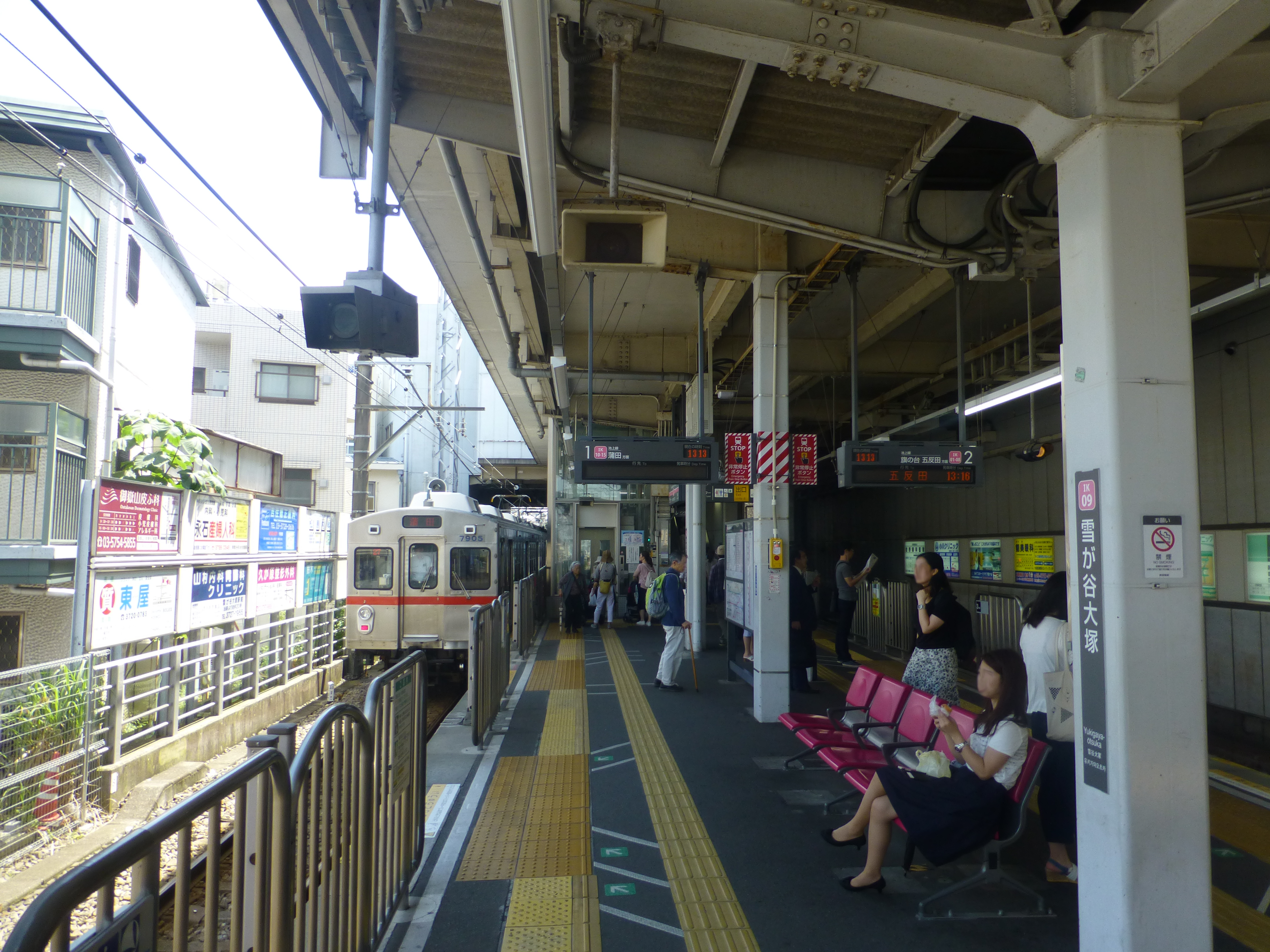
Platforms, 2016

== Station layout ==
One island platform.

1	■ Ikegami Line	Ikegami, Kamata
2	■ Ikegami Line	Hatanodai, Gotanda

== History ==
- In May 1923, Yukigaya Station (雪ヶ谷駅) opened as a station of Ikegami Electric Railway. The station then was placed several hundred meters towards Gotanda.
- In August 1927, Chōfu-ōtsuka Station(調布大塚駅) opened near the present train depot.
- On June 1, 1933, the two stations were merged into Yukigaya Station placed on the present station position.
- In December 1943, the station was renamed to Yukigaya-ōtsuka Station (雪ヶ谷大塚駅).
- On January 20, 1966, the Japanese name was changed to the present one, replacing "ヶ" with "が." The Romanized name unchanged.

== Bus services ==
- Yukigaya (雪が谷) bus stop in front of the station is served by the Tokyu Bus services to Tokyo Medical Center, Ikegami Garage, Kamata Station, Den-en-chōfu Station and Tamagawa Station.
