= Ikegami Line =

Railway line in Tokyo, Japan

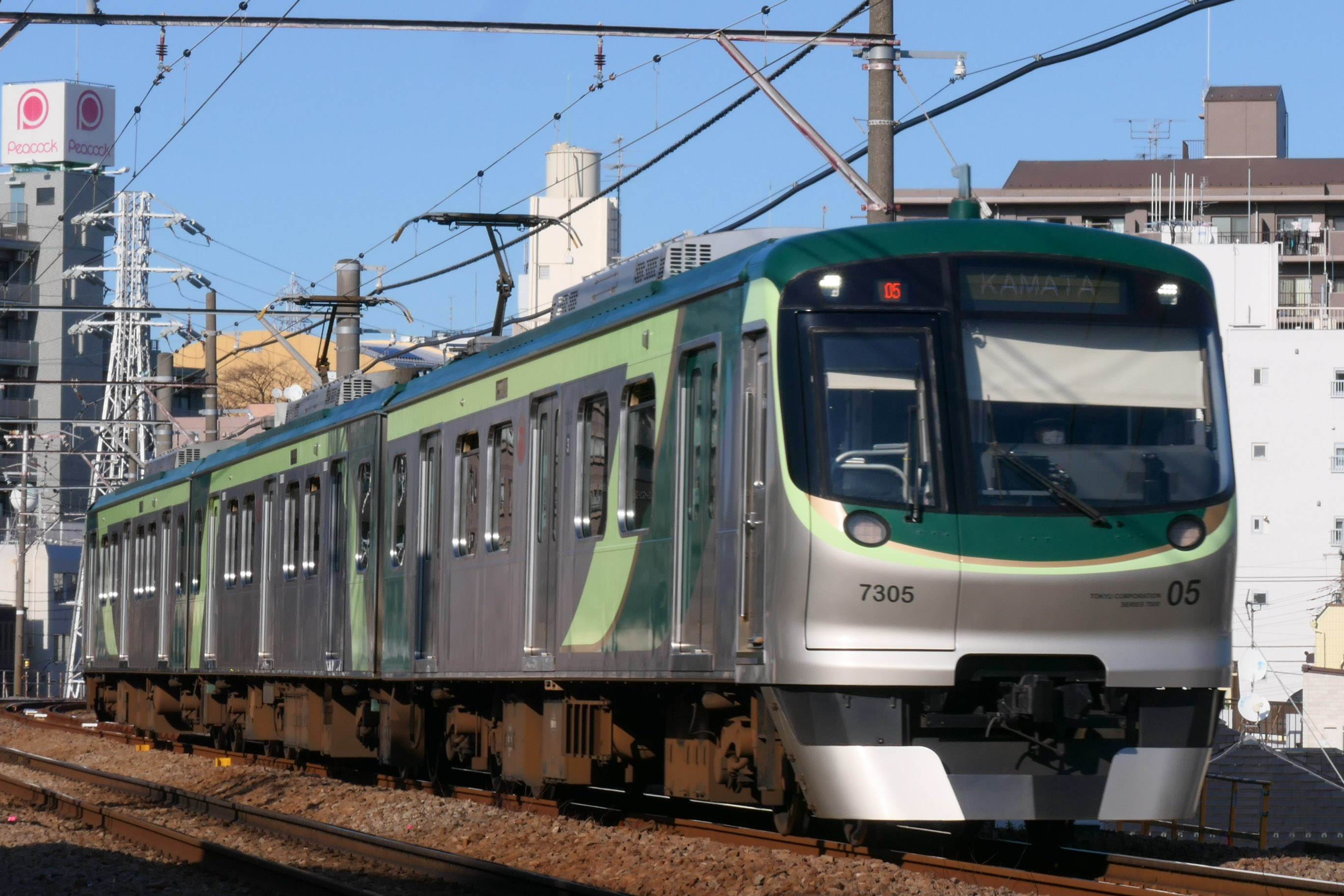
- A Ikegami Line 7000 series EMU in March 2021

Overview
- Native name: 池上線
- Status: In service
- Owner: Tokyu Corporation
- Locale: Tokyo
- Termini: Gotanda; Kamata
- Stations: 15
- Color on map: Pink (#ee86a7)

Service
- Type: Commuter rail
- System: Tokyu Railways
- Route number: IK
- Operator(s): Tokyu Corporation

History
- Opened: 6 October 1922; 103 years ago

Technical
- Line length: 10.8 km (6.7 mi)
- Track gauge: 1,067 mm (3 ft 6 in)
- Electrification: 1,500 V DC overhead catenary

The Ikegami Line (池上線, Ikegami-sen) is a railway line operated by the private railway operator Tokyu Corporation. It runs through Tokyo, extending from Gotanda Station in Shinagawa to Kamata Station in Ōta.

New three-car 7000 series EMUs were introduced in December 2007, with a total of 19 sets delivered by 2011.

== Station list ==
All trains stop at all stations.

No.	Station name		Distance (km)	Transfers	Location (ward)
IK01	Gotanda	五反田	0.0	Yamanote Line (JY23); Asakusa Line (A05)	Shinagawa
IK02	Ōsakihirokōji	大崎広小路	0.3		Shinagawa
IK03	Togoshi-ginza	戸越銀座	1.4	Asakusa Line (Togoshi: A04)	Shinagawa
IK04	Ebara-nakanobu	荏原中延	2.2		Shinagawa
IK05	Hatanodai	旗の台	3.1	Ōimachi Line (OM06)	Shinagawa
IK06	Nagahara	長原	3.7		Ota
IK07	Senzoku-ike	洗足池	4.3		Ota
IK08	Ishikawa-dai	石川台	4.9		Ota
IK09	Yukigaya-ōtsuka	雪が谷大塚	5.6		Ota
IK10	Ontakesan	御嶽山	6.4		Ota
IK11	Kugahara	久が原	7.1		Ota
IK12	Chidorichō	千鳥町	8.0		Ota
IK13	Ikegami	池上	9.1		Ota
IK14	Hasunuma	蓮沼	10.2		Ota
IK15	Kamata	蒲田	10.8	Keihin–Tōhoku Line (JK17); Tōkyū Tamagawa Line (TM07)	Ota

== Rolling stock used ==
=== Current ===
- 1000 series 3-car sets (since 1990)
- 7000 series 3-car sets (since December 2007, shared with Tokyu Tamagawa Line)
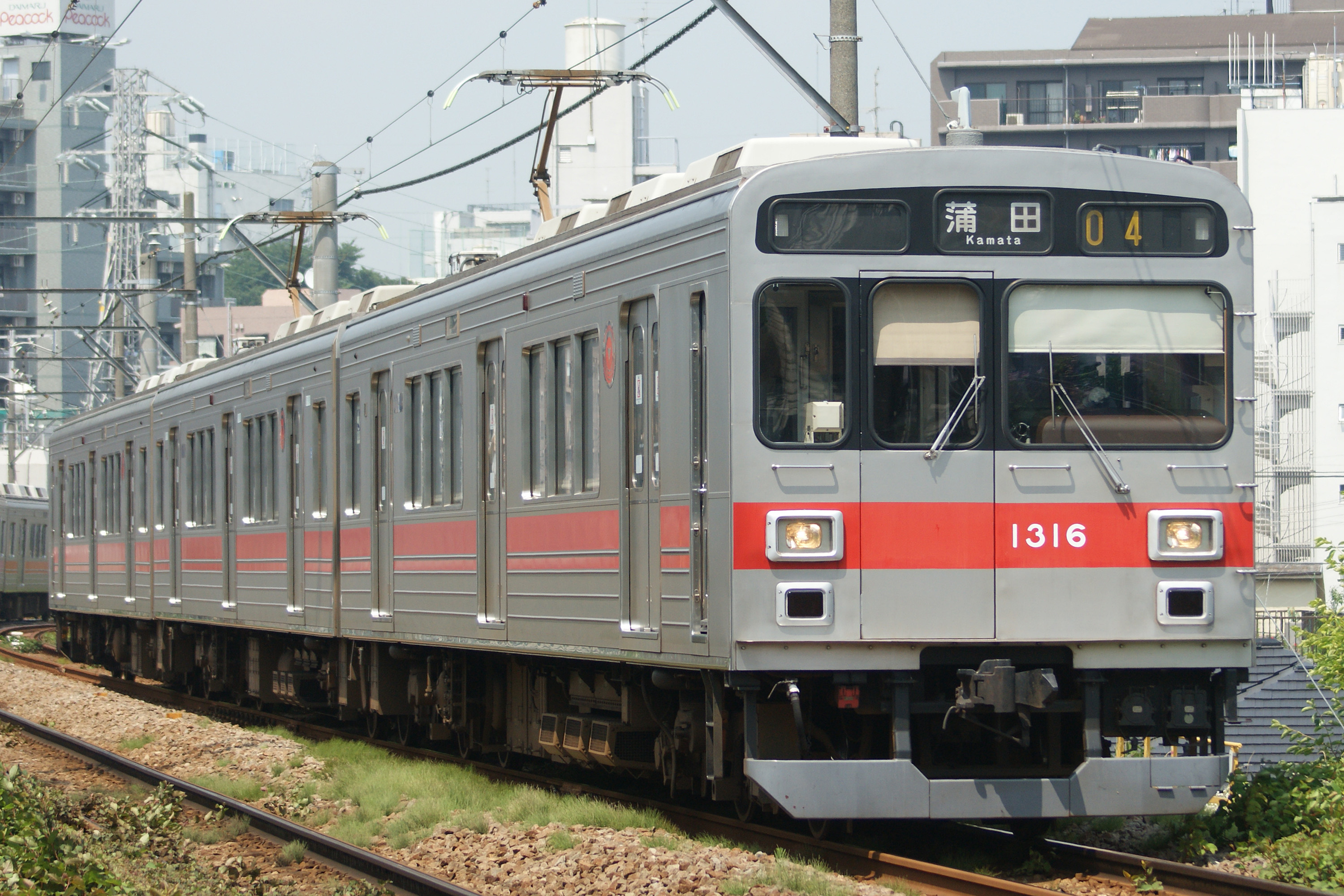
A 1000 series EMU

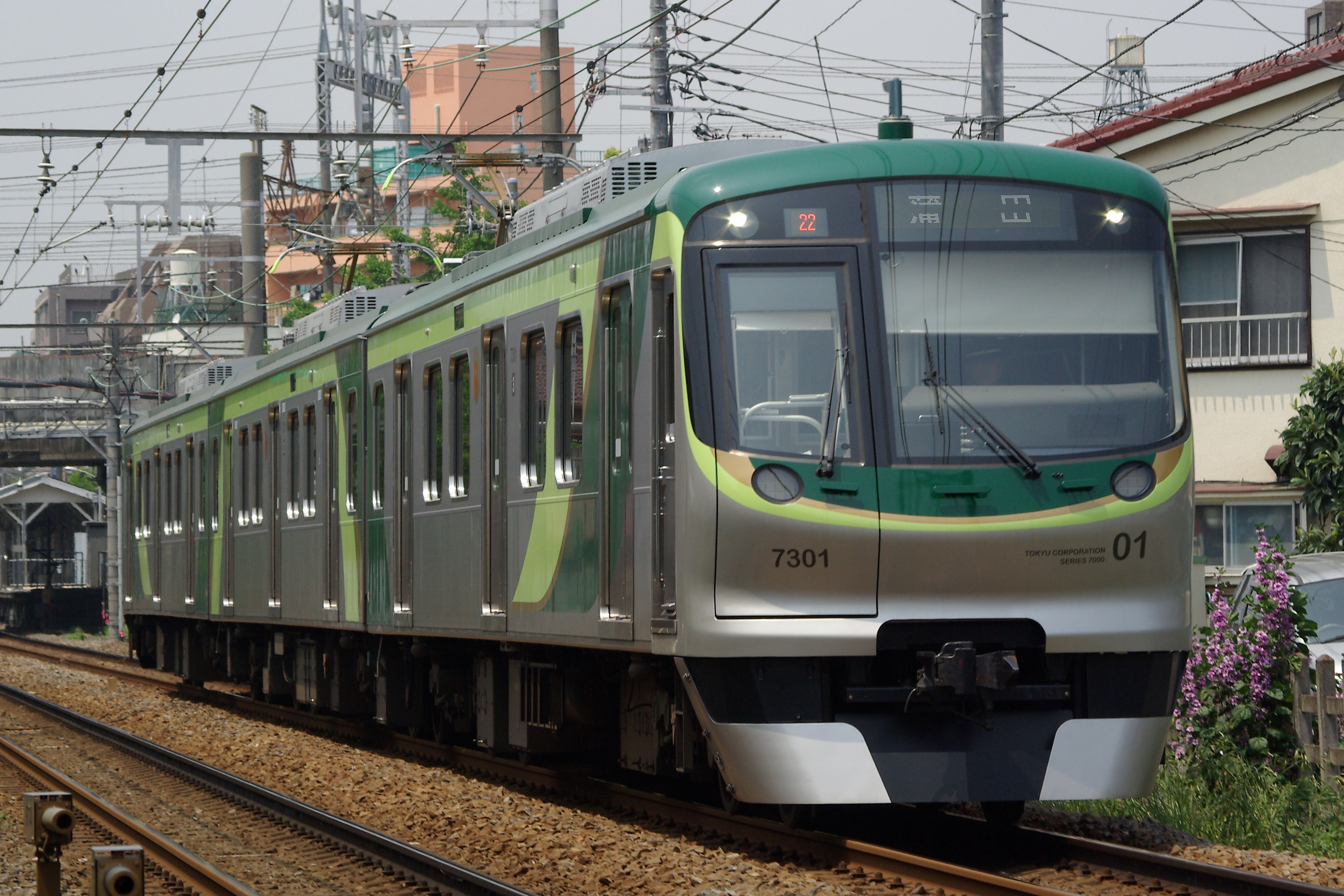
A 7000 series EMU

=== Former ===
- 7600 series 3-car sets (from 1986 to 2015)
- 7700 series 3-car sets (from 1987 to 2018)
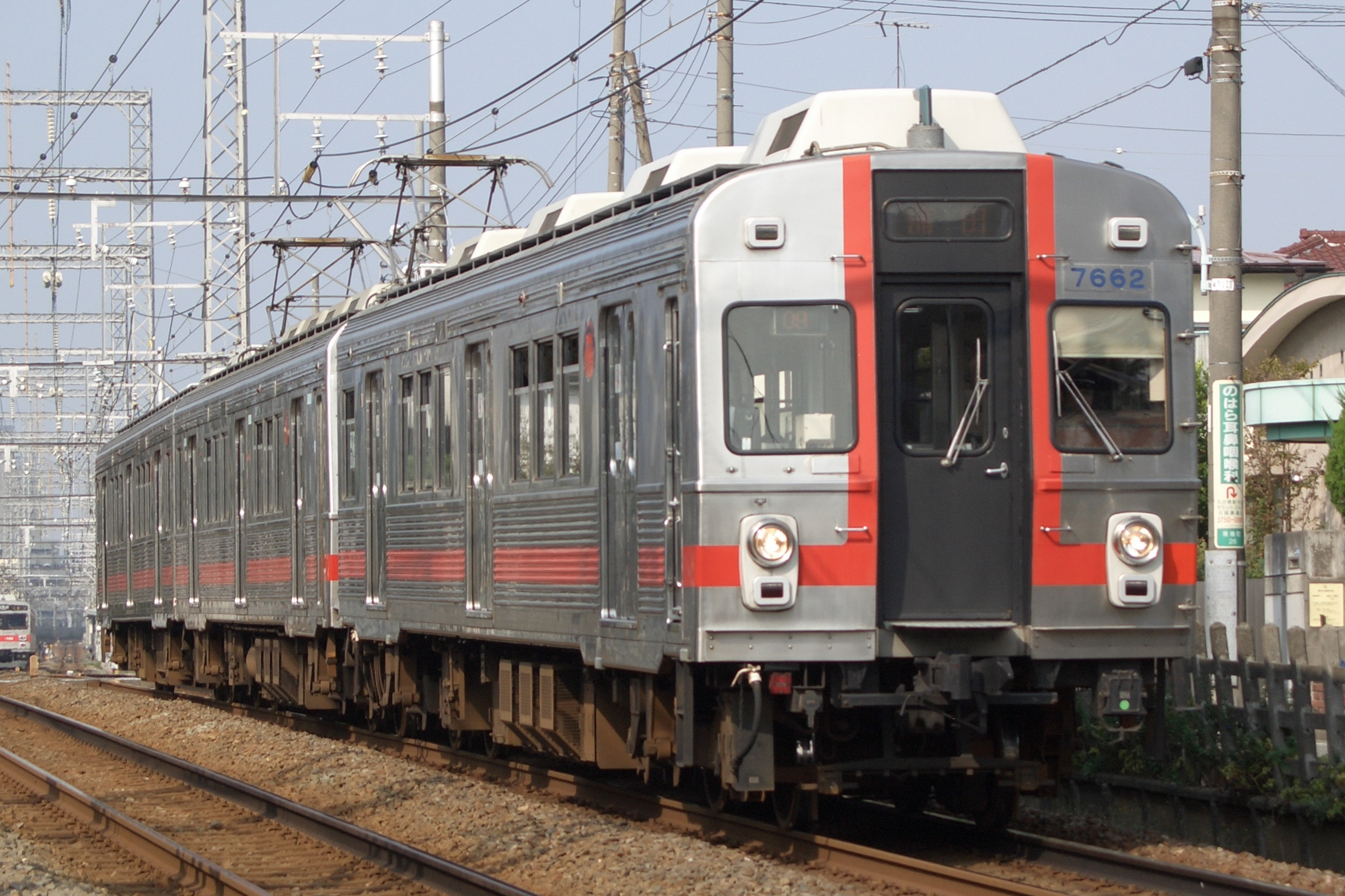
A 7600 series EMU in November 2006

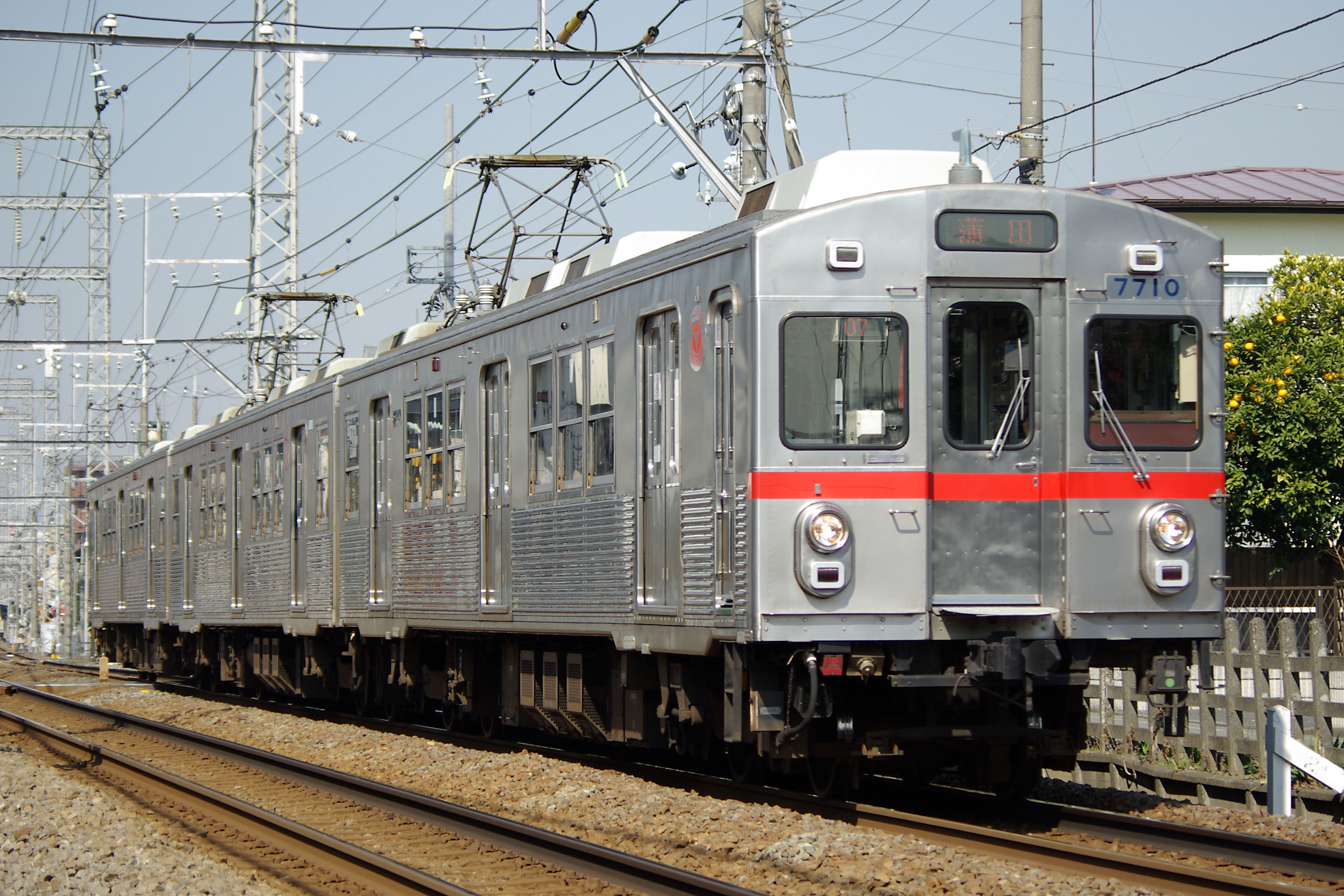
A 7700 series EMU in February 2007

== History ==
The line first opened on 6 October 1922 between Kamata and Ikegami, running 1.8 km. On 4 May 1923, this was extended 3.7 km from Ikegami to Yukigaya.

- 1926-08-06: Keidai Ground-mae Station opens (now Chidorichō Station).
- 1927-08-19: Chōfu-Ōtsuka Station opens between Yukigaya and Ontakesan.
- 1927-08-28: Section opens between Yukigaya and Kirigaya (now closed), located between Ōsakihirokoji and Togoshi-Ginza (4.7 km).
- 1927-10-09: Line opens between Kirigaya and Ōsaki-Hirokoji (0.6 km).
- 1928-04-13: Ishikawa Station renamed Ishikawadai, and Suehiro Station renamed Higashi-chōfu (now Kugahara).
- 1928-06-17: Line opens between Ōsakihirokoji and Gotanda (0.3 km), completing line.
- 1933-06-01: Chōfu-ōtsuka Station combined with Yukigaya Station and renamed Yukigaya-ōtsuka; Ontakesan-mae Station renamed Ontakesan.
- 1936-01-01: Higashi-chōfu Station renamed Kugahara; Keidai Ground-mae Station renamed Chidorichō.
- 1951-05-01: Hatagaoka Station moved to Hatanodai Station on Ōimachi Line.
- 1953-08-12: Kirigaya Station closes.

The line voltage was raised from 600 V to 1,500 V DC from 10 August 1957.

The 3000 series trains were withdrawn on 18 March 1989.

On 19 March 1989, Ebara-nakanobu Station was moved underground.

From 16 March 1998, wanman driver-only operation commenced on the line.

== See also ==
- List of railway lines in Japan
