= Hatanodai Station =

Railway station in Tokyo, Japan

Coordinates: 35°36′17″N 139°42′10″E

Hatanodai Station 旗の台駅

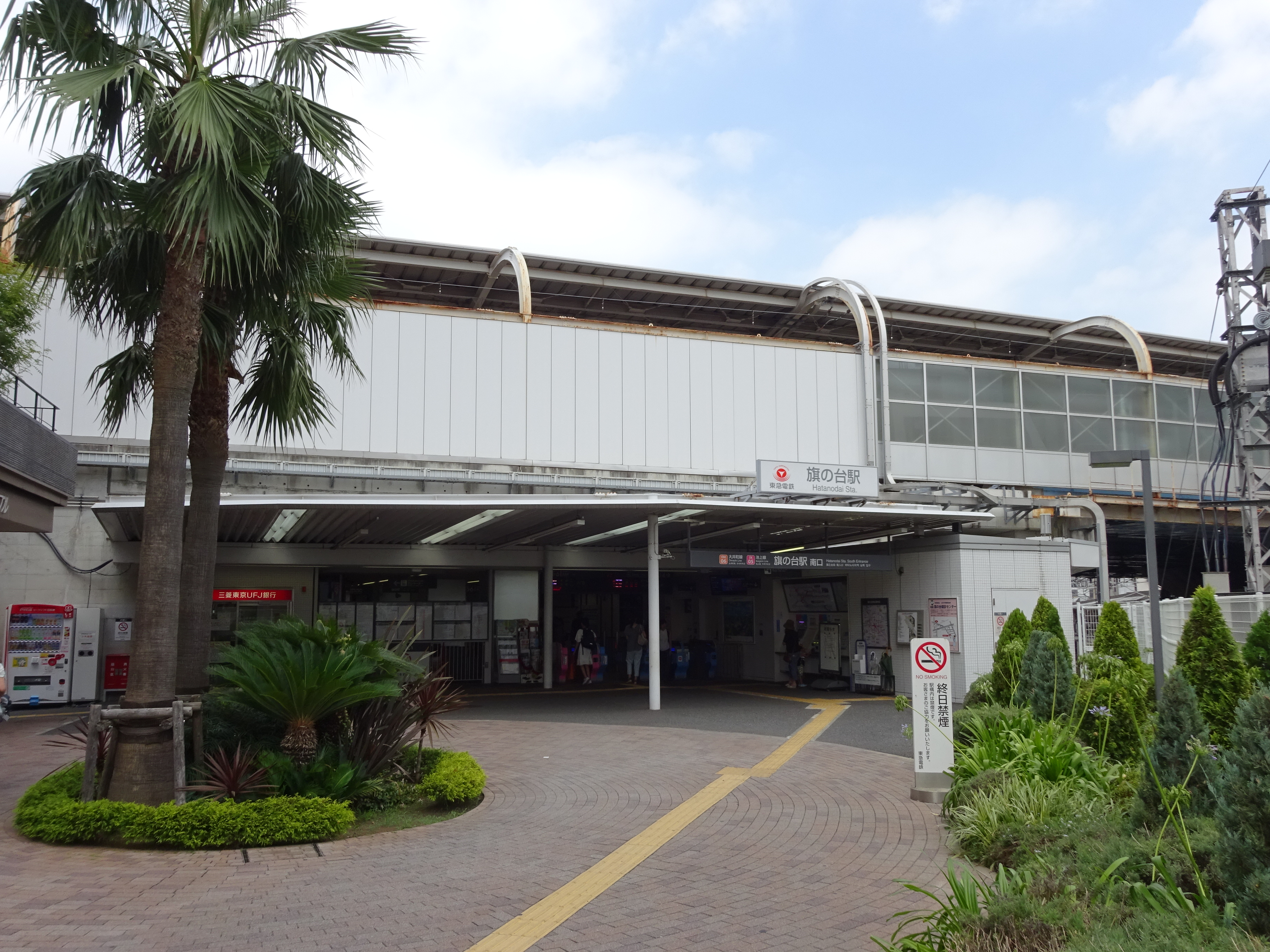
- South Entrance of Hatanodai Station

General information
- Location: 2-13-1 Hatanodai, Shinagawa Ward, Tokyo; Japan
- Operator: Tōkyū Railways
- Lines: Ōimachi Line; Ikegami Line
- Platforms: 2 side platforms, 2 island platforms
- Tracks: 6

Construction
- Structure type: Elevated and at grade

Other information
- Station code: IK05, OM06
- Website: Official website

History
- Opened: 6 July 1927; 99 years ago
- Former names: Higashi-senzoku (until 1951)

Services
Preceding station	Tōkyū Railways	Following station
Nagahara towards Kamata	Ikegami Line	Ebara-nakanobu towards Gotanda
Ōokayama towards Mizonokuchi	Ōimachi Line Express	Ōimachi Terminus
Kita-senzoku towards Mizonokuchi	Ōimachi Line Local Local	Ebaramachi towards Ōimachi
Location
- Location within Special wards of Tokyo Location within Tokyo Bay and Bōsō Peninsula Location within Tokyo Location within Japan

Hatanodai Station (旗の台駅, Hatanodai-eki) is a station in southeast Tokyo, Japan. It is the only station on the Ōimachi Line with two tracks in each direction, being used for transfer between local and express trains.

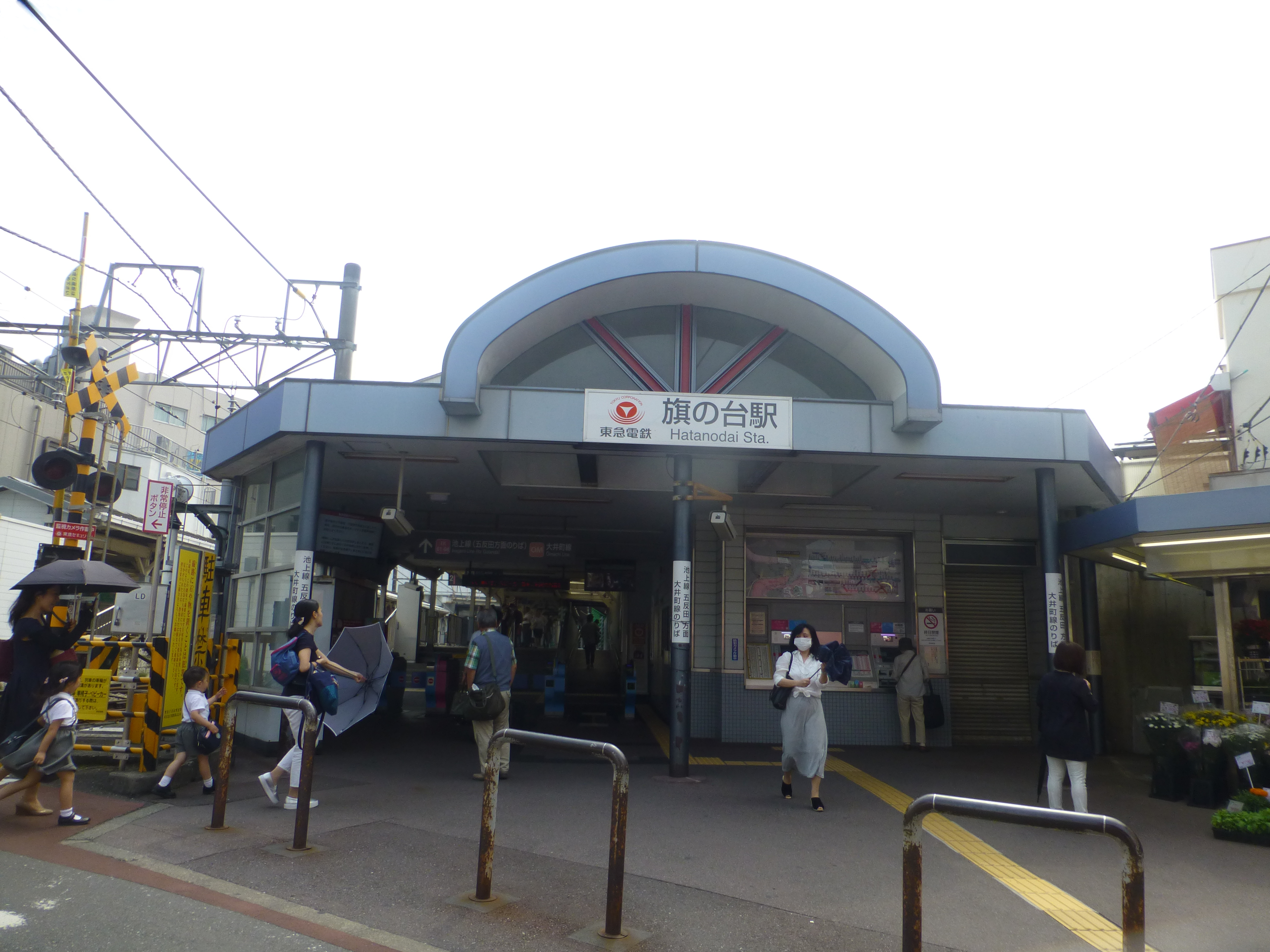
East exit, 2016

== Station layout ==
1	■ Tokyu Ikegami Line	for Yukigaya-ōtsuka, Ikegami and Kamata
2	■ Tokyu Ikegami Line	for Togoshi-Ginza and Gotanda
3-4	■ Tokyu Oimachi Line	for Ōokayama, Jiyūgaoka, Todoroki, Futako-Tamagawa; Tokyu Den-en-Toshi Line for Saginuma and Chūō-Rinkan
5-6	■ Tokyu Oimachi Line	for Nakanobu and Ōimachi

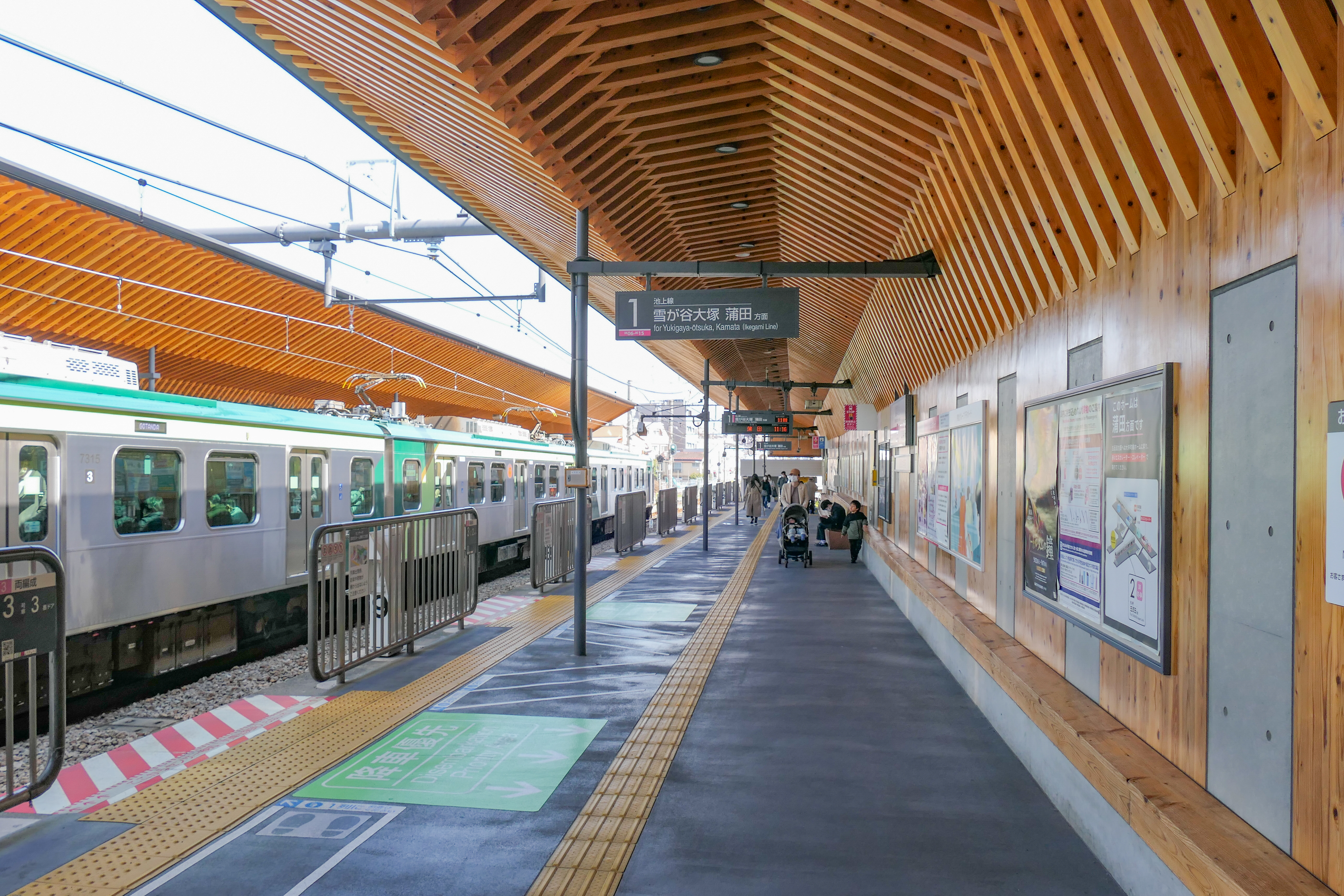
Platform 1

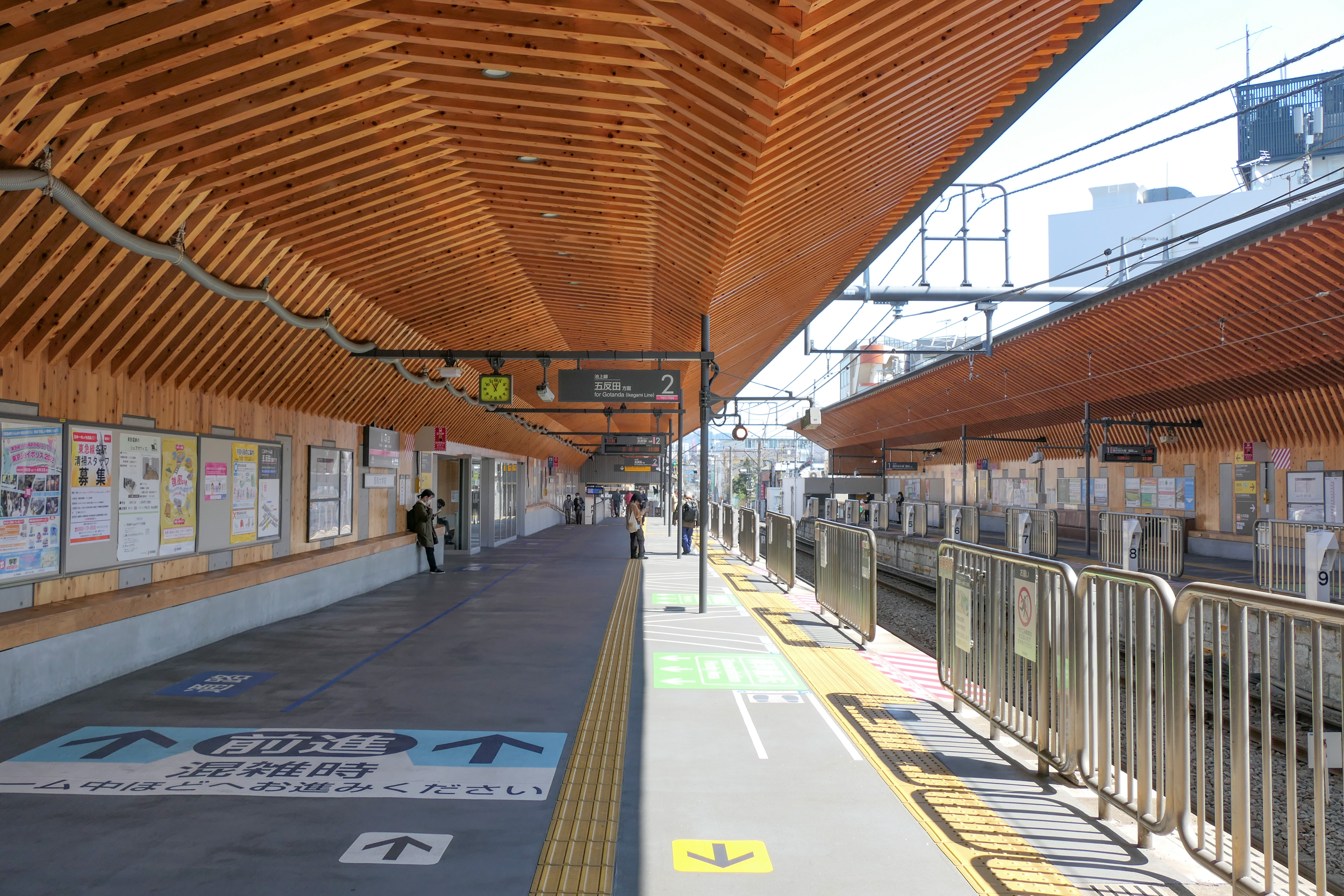
Platform 2

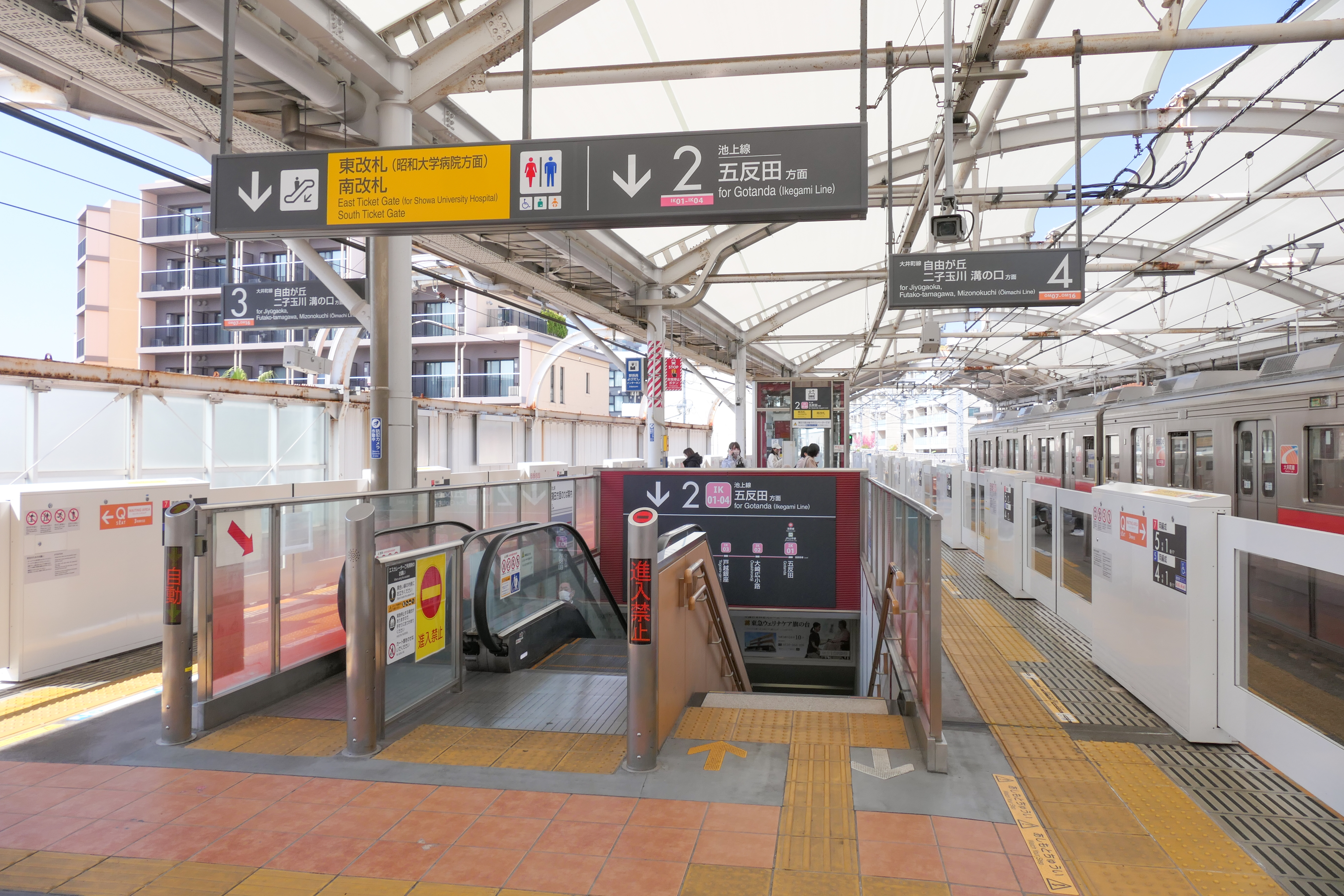
Platforms 3 & 4

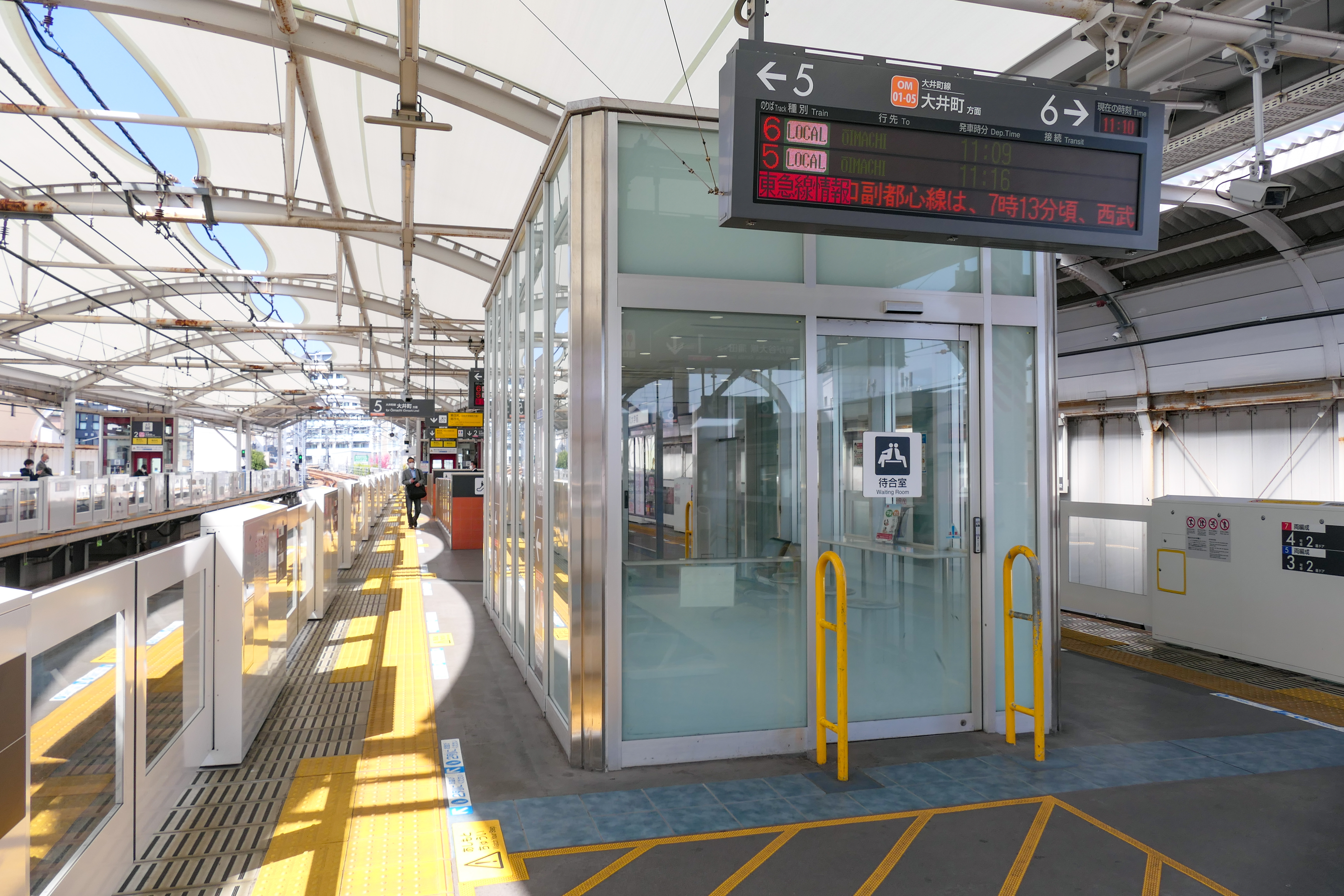
Platforms 5 & 6

The Tokyu Oimachi Line platforms are scheduled to be lengthened to handle seven-car trains on express services during fiscal 2017.

== History ==
- July 6, 1927: Higashi-senzoku Station (東洗足駅) of Meguro-Kamata Electric Railway opened.
- August 1927: Hatagaoka Station (旗ヶ岡駅) of Ikegami Electric Railway opened.
- March 1951: Higashi-senzoku Station was renamed Hatanodai and rebuilt on the present position on the Oimachi Line.
- May 1951: Hatagaoka Station merged with Hatanodai Station and rebuilt on the present position on the Ikegami Line.

== Surrounding area ==
- Showa University (Hatanodai Campus) and the university hospital

== See also ==
- List of railway stations in Japan
