= Gotanda Station =

Railway and metro station in Tokyo, Japan

Coordinates: 35.62645°N 139.7234°E

JY23 Gotanda Station 五反田駅

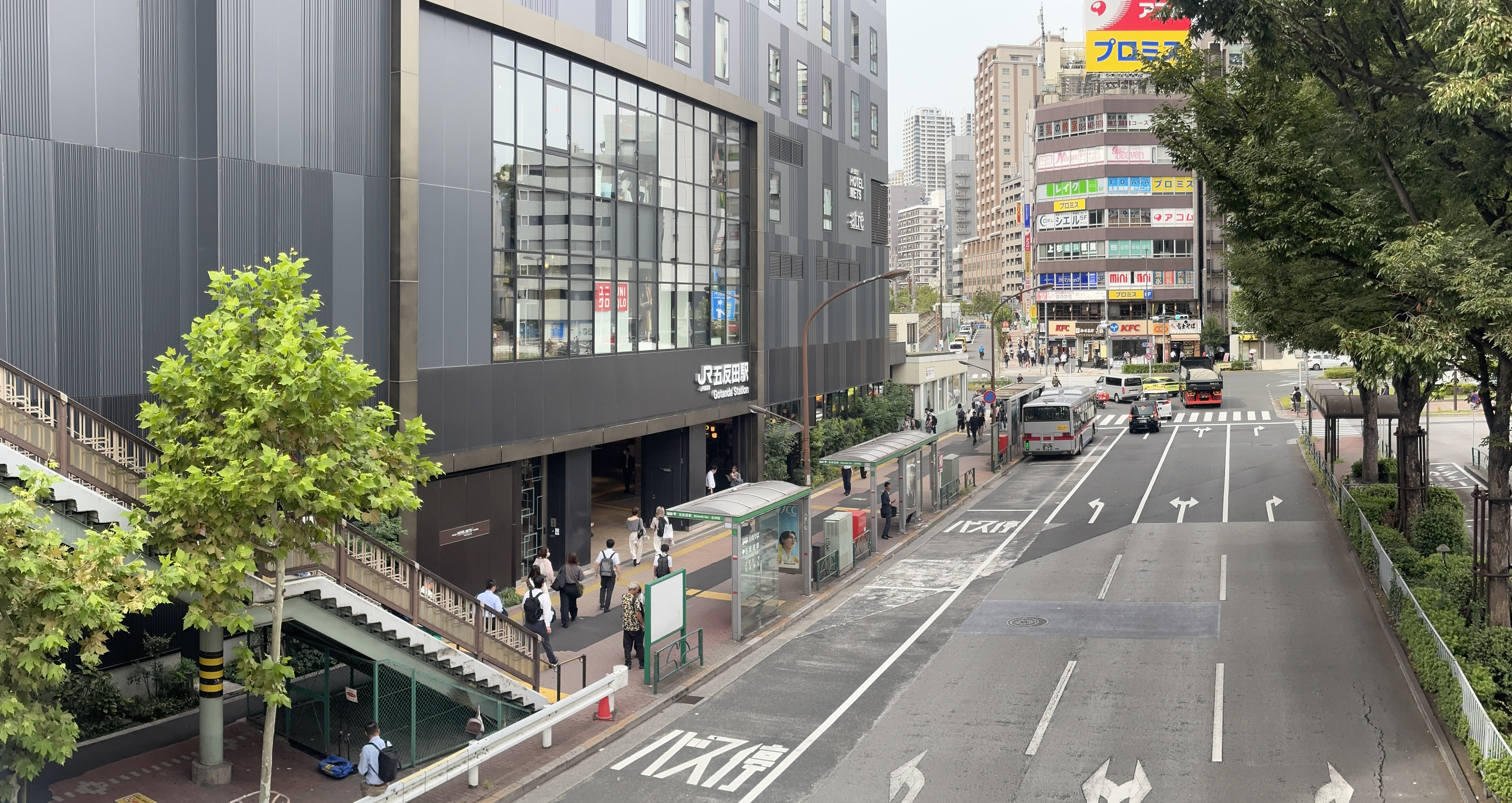
- Gotanda Station, east exit, 2025

General information
- Location: Higashigotanda; Shinagawa, Tokyo; Japan
- Operator: JR East; Tōkyū Railways; Toei Subway
- Lines: Yamanote Line; Ikegami Line; Asakusa Line

History
- Opened: 15 October 1911; 114 years ago

Passengers
- FY2024: 220,642 daily (JR East)
- FY2024: 95,723 daily (Tokyu)
- FY2024: 59,177 daily (Toei Subway)

Services
Preceding station	JR East	Following station
Ōsaki Next counter-clockwise	Yamanote Line	Meguro JY22 Next clockwise
Preceding station	Tōkyū Railways	Following station
Ōsakihirokōji towards Kamata	Ikegami Line	Terminus
Preceding station	Toei Subway	Following station
Togoshi towards Nishi-magome	Asakusa Line	Takanawadai towards Oshiage
Location
- Location within Tokyo Yamanote Loop Location within Tokyo wards area Location within Japan

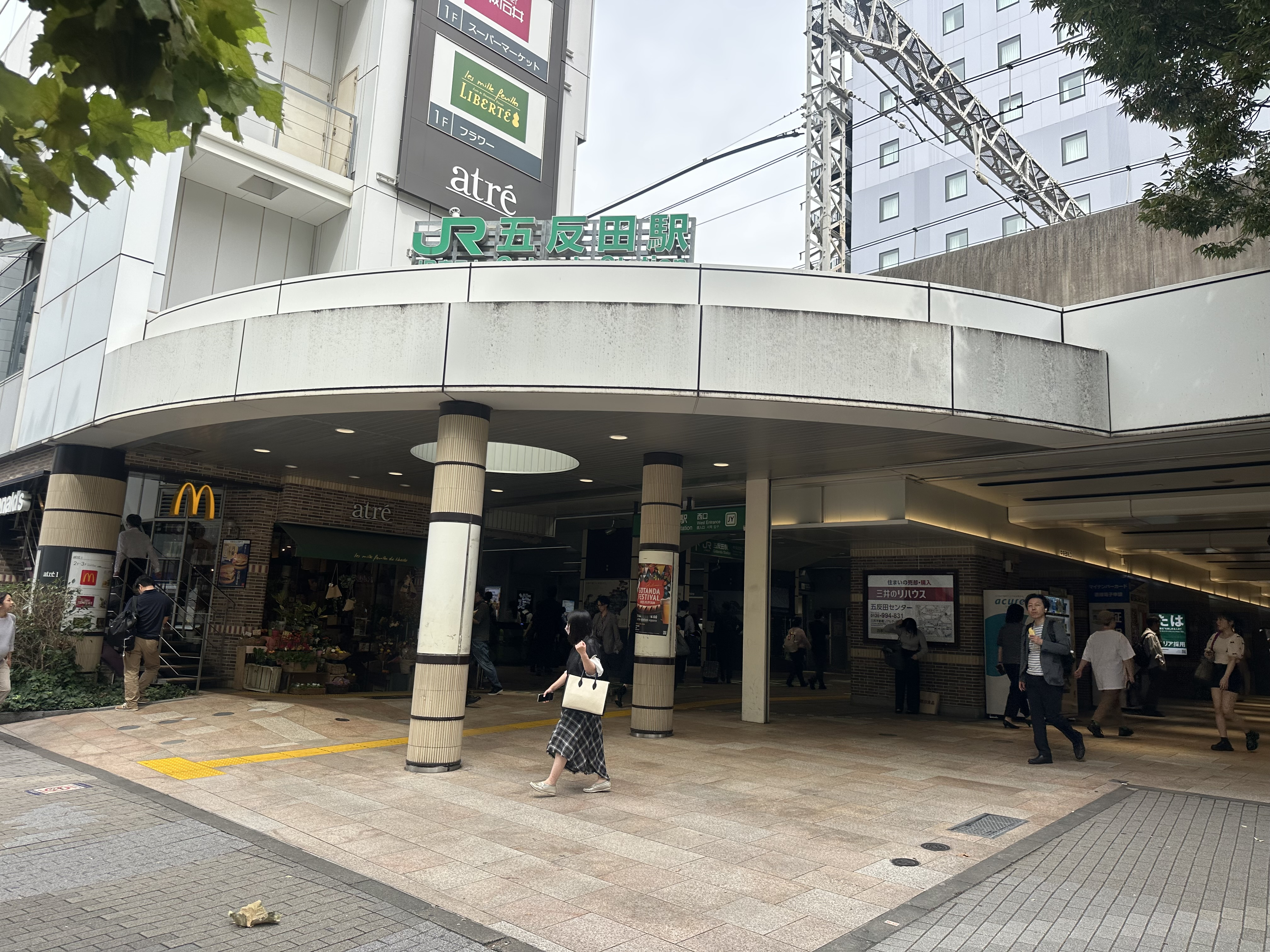
West exit, 2025

Gotanda Station (Japanese: 五反田駅, Hepburn: Gotanda-eki) is a railway station in Shinagawa, Tokyo, Japan, operated by the East Japan Railway Company (JR East), the private railway operator Tokyu Corporation, and the Tokyo subway operator Toei.

== Station layout ==
=== JR East ===
The JR East station consists of an elevated island platform serving two tracks. The station has a "Midori no Madoguchi" staffed ticket office.

1	Yamanote Line	for Shinagawa, Tokyo, and Ueno
2	Yamanote Line	for Shibuya, Shinjuku, and Ikebukuro

Chest-height platform edge doors were installed on the Yamanote Line platforms in February 2015, with operation commencing in March.

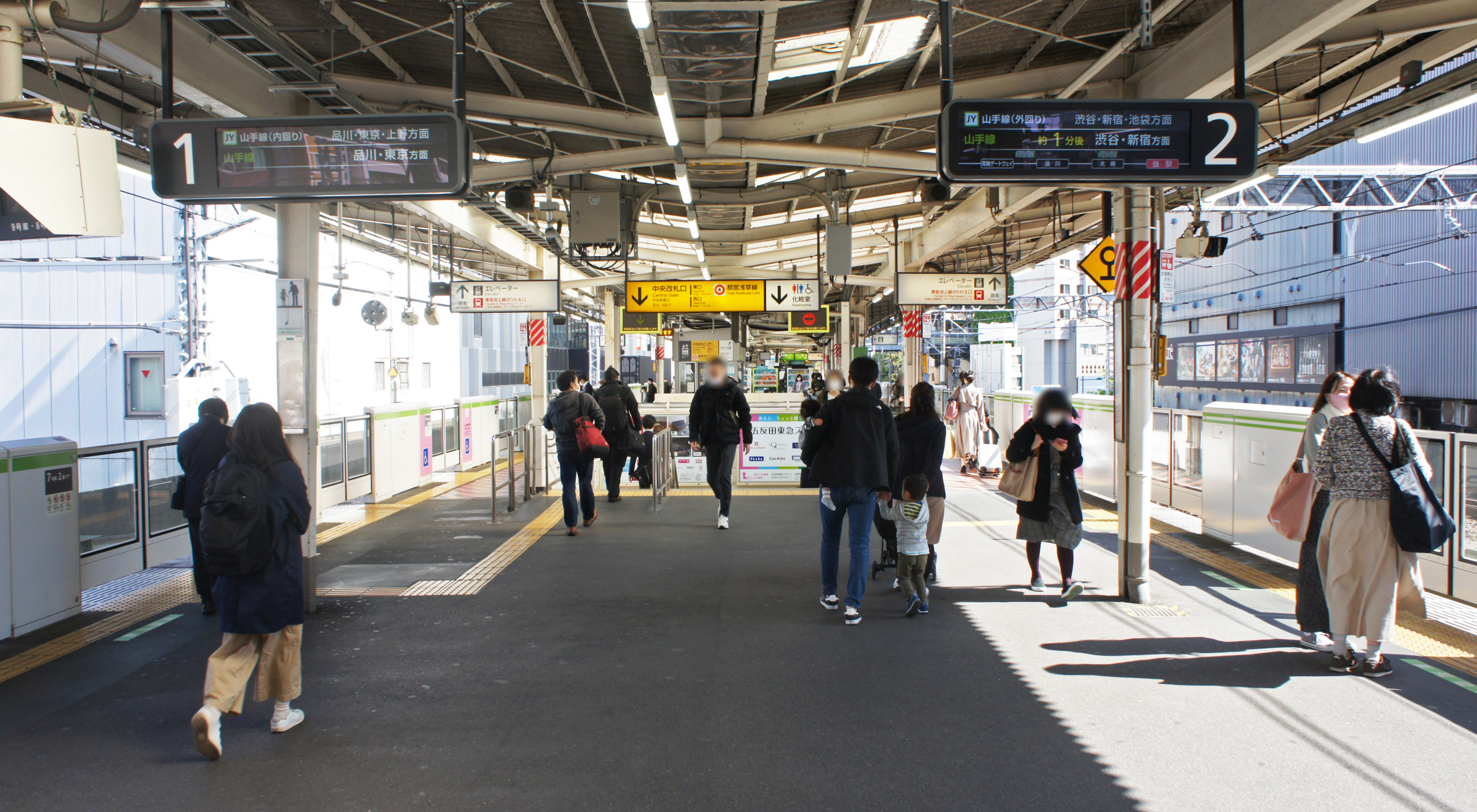
JR platforms, 2021

=== Tokyu ===
The Tokyu station consists of one elevated island platform serving two tracks, located above the JR platforms.

1-2	Ikegami Line	for Hatanodai, Yukigaya-Ōtsuka, and Kamata

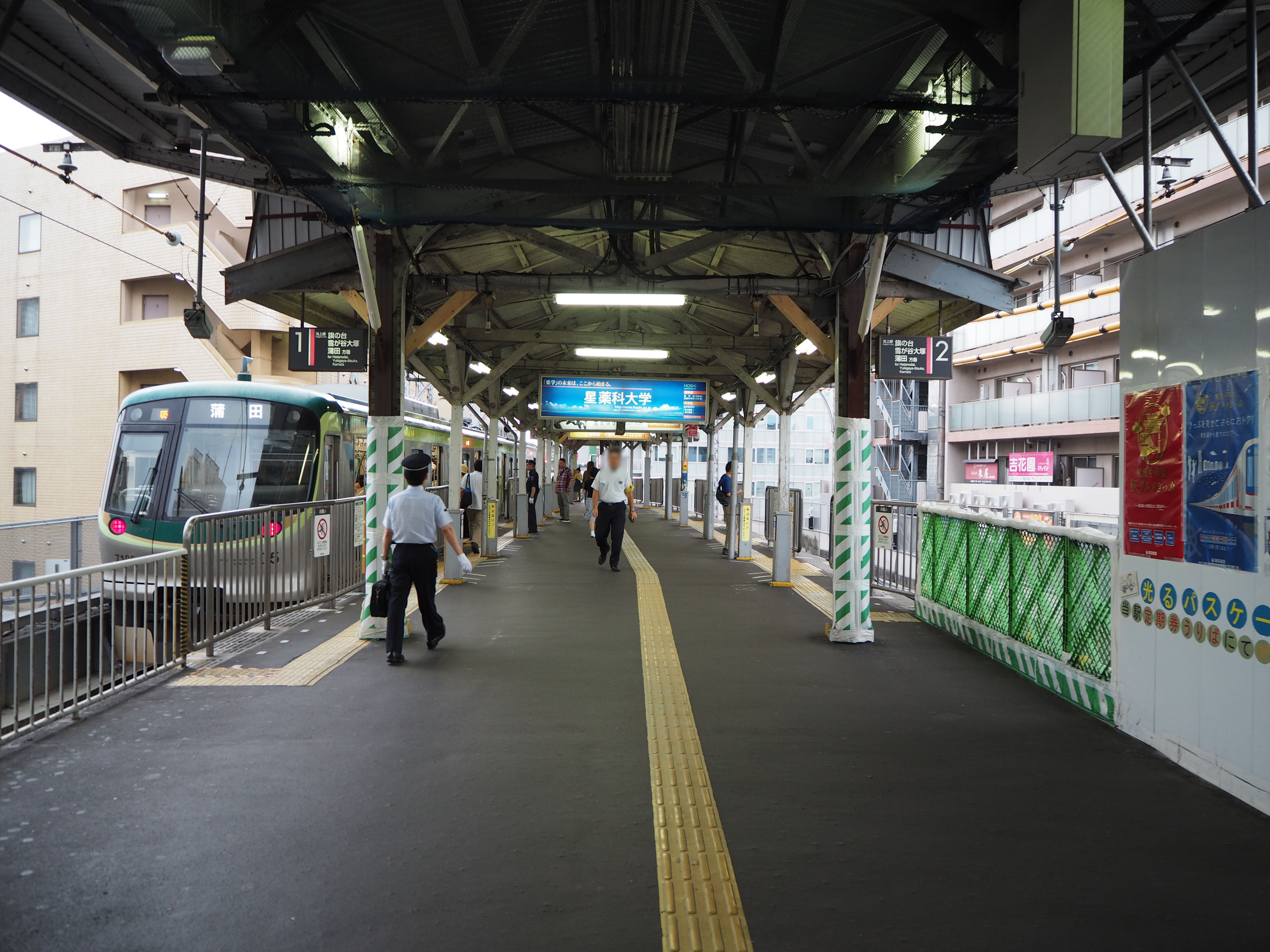
Tokyu platforms, 2016

=== Toei ===
The Toei subway station consists of one underground island platform serving two tracks.

1	Asakusa Line	for Nishi-magome
2	Asakusa Line	for Sengakuji, Nihombashi, and Oshiage; Keisei Main Line for Aoto, Keisei Takasago, Keisei Sakura, Keisei Narita, and Narita Airport (Terminal 2·3 and Terminal 1); Hokusō Line for Imba Nihon-idai; Narita Sky Access Line for Narita Airport; Shibayama Railway Line for Shibayama-Chiyoda

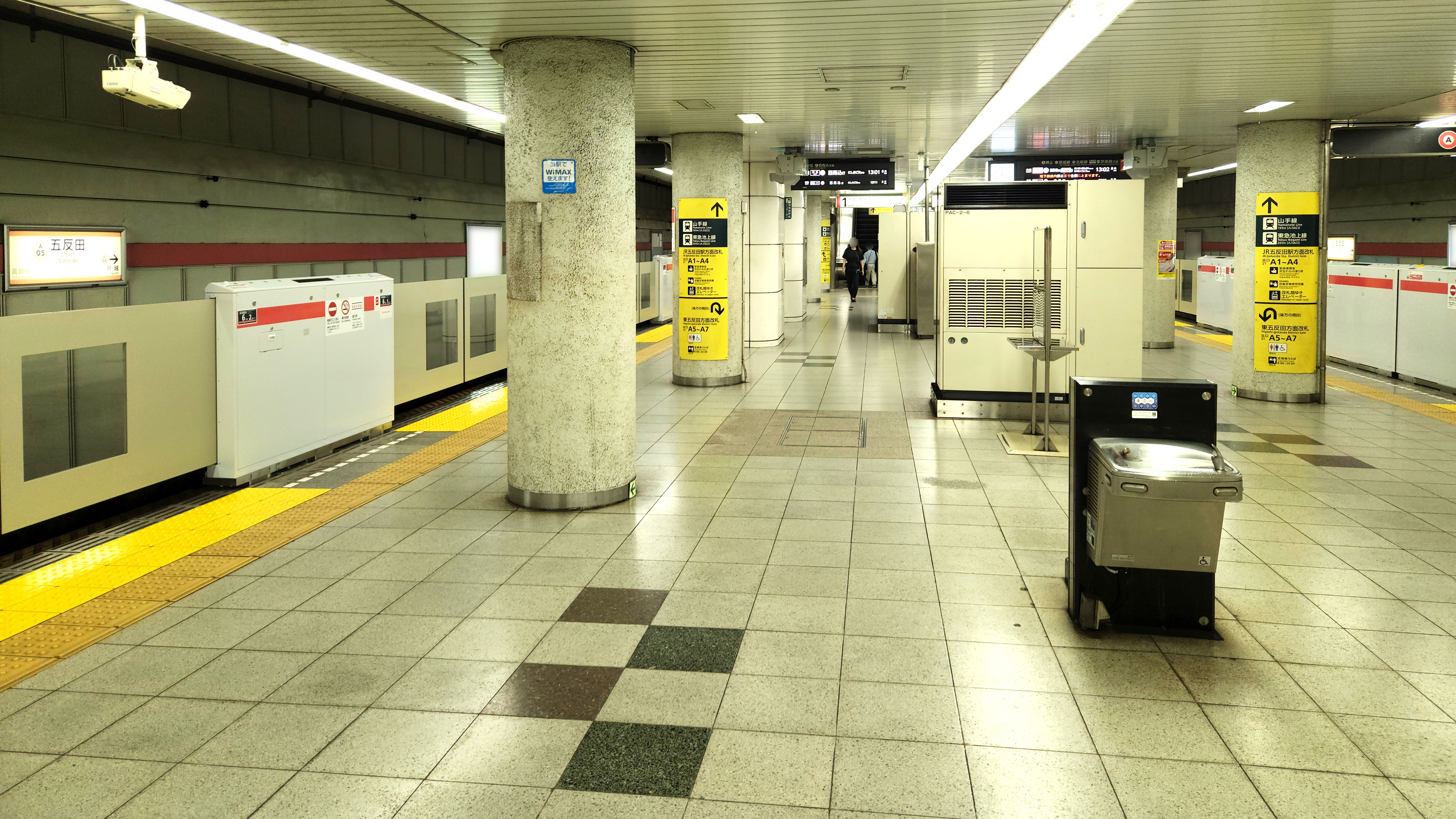
Toei platform in August 2023

== History ==
The JR station first opened on 15 October 1911. The Tokyu Ikegami Line station opened on 17 June 1928. The Toei Asakusa Line station opened on 15 November 1968.

Station numbering was introduced to the JR East platforms in 2016 with Gotanda being assigned JY23.

== Passenger statistics ==
In fiscal 2013, the JR East station was used by 132,524 passengers daily (boarding passengers only), making it the 24th-busiest station operated by JR East. Over the same fiscal year, the Tokyu station was used by an average of 108,025 passengers daily (entering and exiting passengers), making it the busiest station on the Ikegami Line.

The daily passenger figures for each operator in previous years are as shown below.

Fiscal year	JR East	Tokyu
1999	133,202	
2000	132,411	
2005	126,137	101,969
2010	129,154	102,101
2011	127,996	101,904
2012	130,633	105,167
2013	132,524	108,025

- Note that JR East figures are for boarding passengers only.

== Surrounding area ==
- Seisen University
- Rissho University
- Tokyo Health Care University
- NTT Medical Center Tokyo
- Ikedayama Park

== See also ==
- List of railway stations in Japan
