= Shibuya Scramble Square =

Skyscraper in Tokyo, Japan

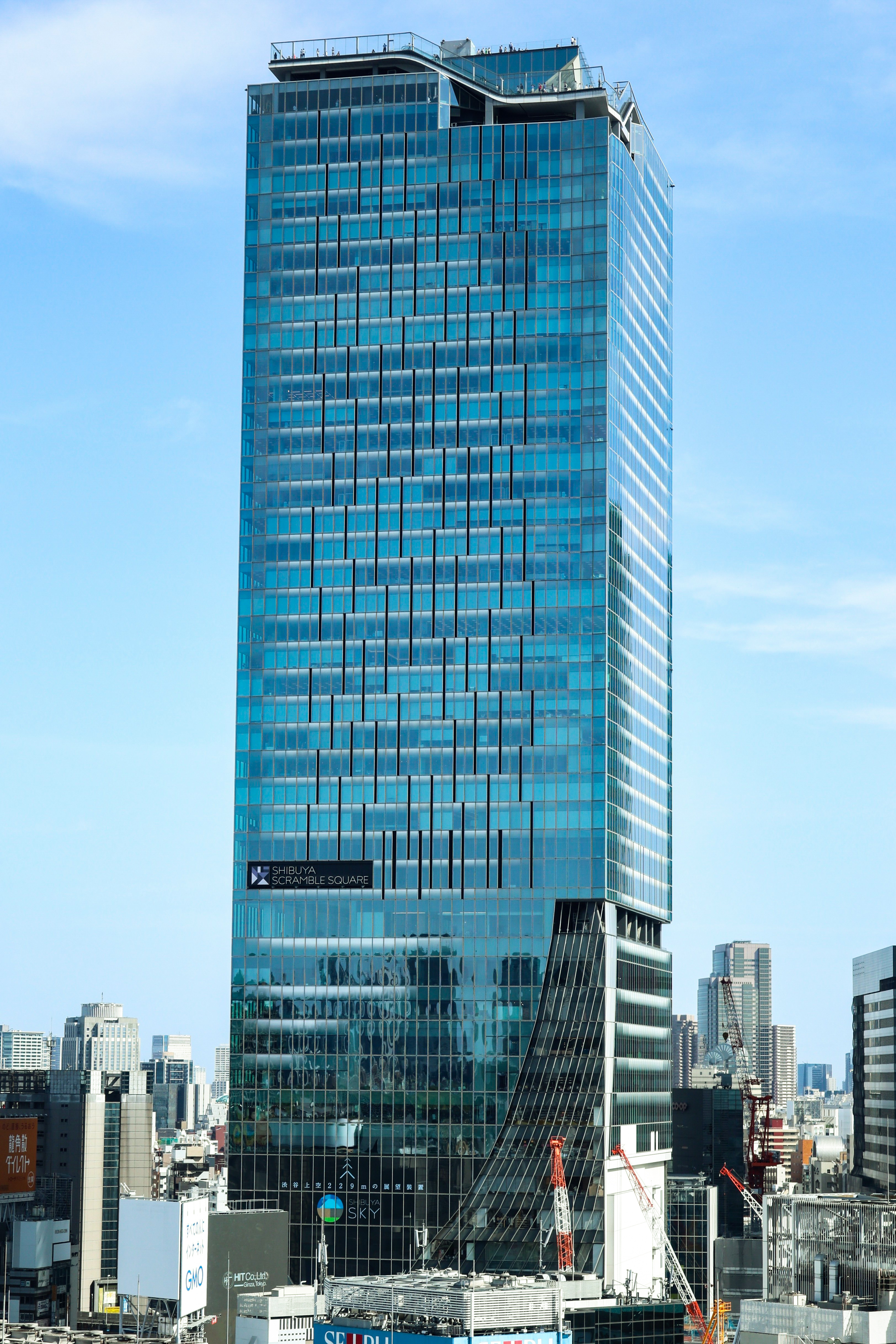
- Interactive map of the Shibuya Scramble Square area

General information
- Type: Subway station, mixed-use, observation deck
- Location: 2-23 Shibuya Shibuya, Tokyo, Japan
- Coordinates: 35°39′29″N 139°42′05″E
- Construction started: June 2014
- Completed: October 2019 (East Tower); FY 2031 (Central and West Tower)
- Owner: Tokyu Corporation, East Japan Railway Company, Tokyo Metro joint-venture (Shibuya Scramble Square Co.)

Height
- Antenna spire: Eastern building: 229.71 m Central building: 61 m Western building: 76 m
- Roof: Eastern building: 228.3 m
- Top floor: East building: 226 m

Technical details
- Floor count: East building: 47 (7 underground) Central building: 10 (2 underground) Western building: 13 (5 underground)
- Floor area: 276,000 m^{2}

Design and construction
- Architects: Nikken Sekkei, Kengo Kuma and Associates, SANAA, Tokyu Architects and Engineers Inc., JR East Design Corporation, East Japan Railway Company
- Developer: Tokyu Corporation, JR East, Tokyo Metro

Website
- www.shibuya-scramble-square.com

Shibuya Scramble Square (Japanese: 渋谷スクランブルスクエア Shibuya Sukuranburu Sukuea) is a mixed-use skyscraper connected to Shibuya Station in Shibuya, Tokyo, Japan.

It is part of a redevelopment of the station area. Located above Shibuya Station, the complex consists of three buildings, including an eastern building, Shibuya Scramble Square (229.71 m height), a central building (61 m height) and a western building (76 m height).

Construction of the complex began in 2014 and is scheduled for completion in FY 2031. The total floor area is 276,000 m^{2}. The eastern building of the complex, the Shibuya Scramble Square skyscraper, was completed in October 2019 and opened on November 1, 2019, with an area of 181,000 m^{2}. Shibuya Scramble Square surpassed the Cerulean Tower in height and became the highest skyscraper in the district of Shibuya. The Shibuya Scramble Square underground floor is directly connected to Shibuya Station. An observation deck, "SHIBUYA SKY", is located on the roof of the skyscraper. The complex includes shops, offices, an observation deck, and a parking area.

Shibuya Scramble Square takes its name from "Shibuya Scramble Crossing", the world-famous pedestrian crossing located just a few meters from the building. This is the busiest pedestrian crossing in the world as people can walk in every direction, making it quick and accessible to reach every building near by Shibuya station.

== Gallery ==
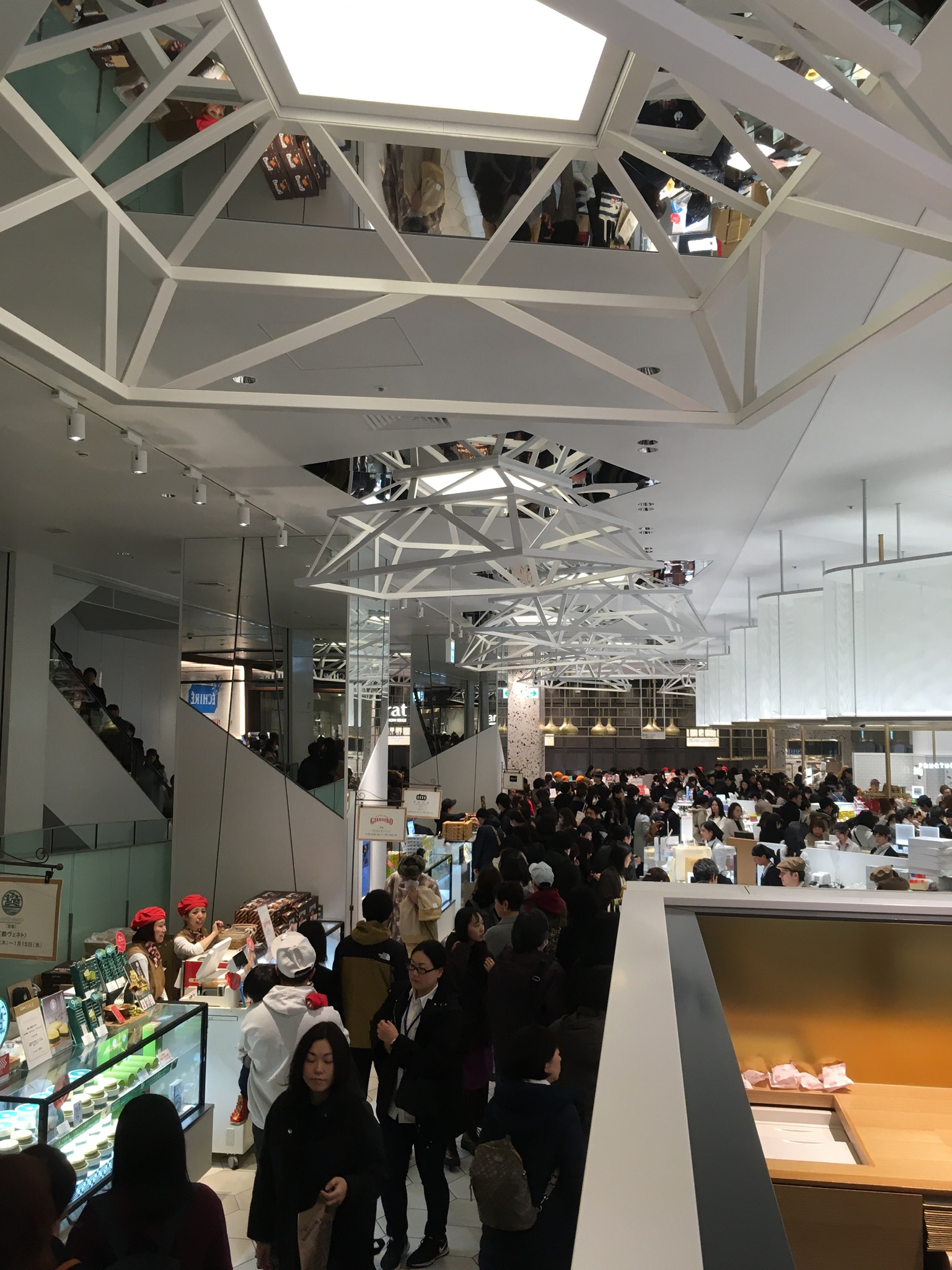
The first floor lobby of Shibuya Scramble Square

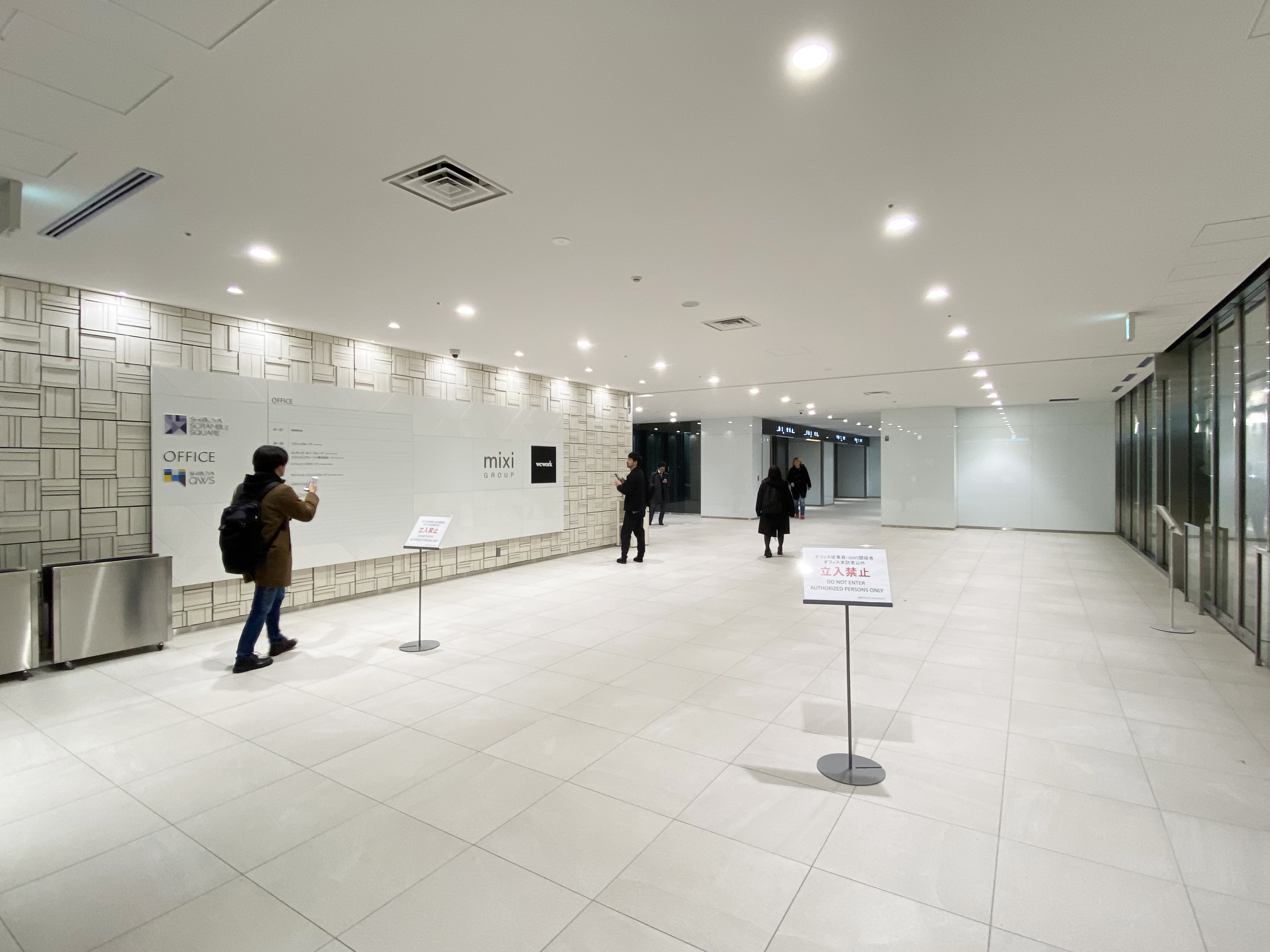
Office shuttle lobby

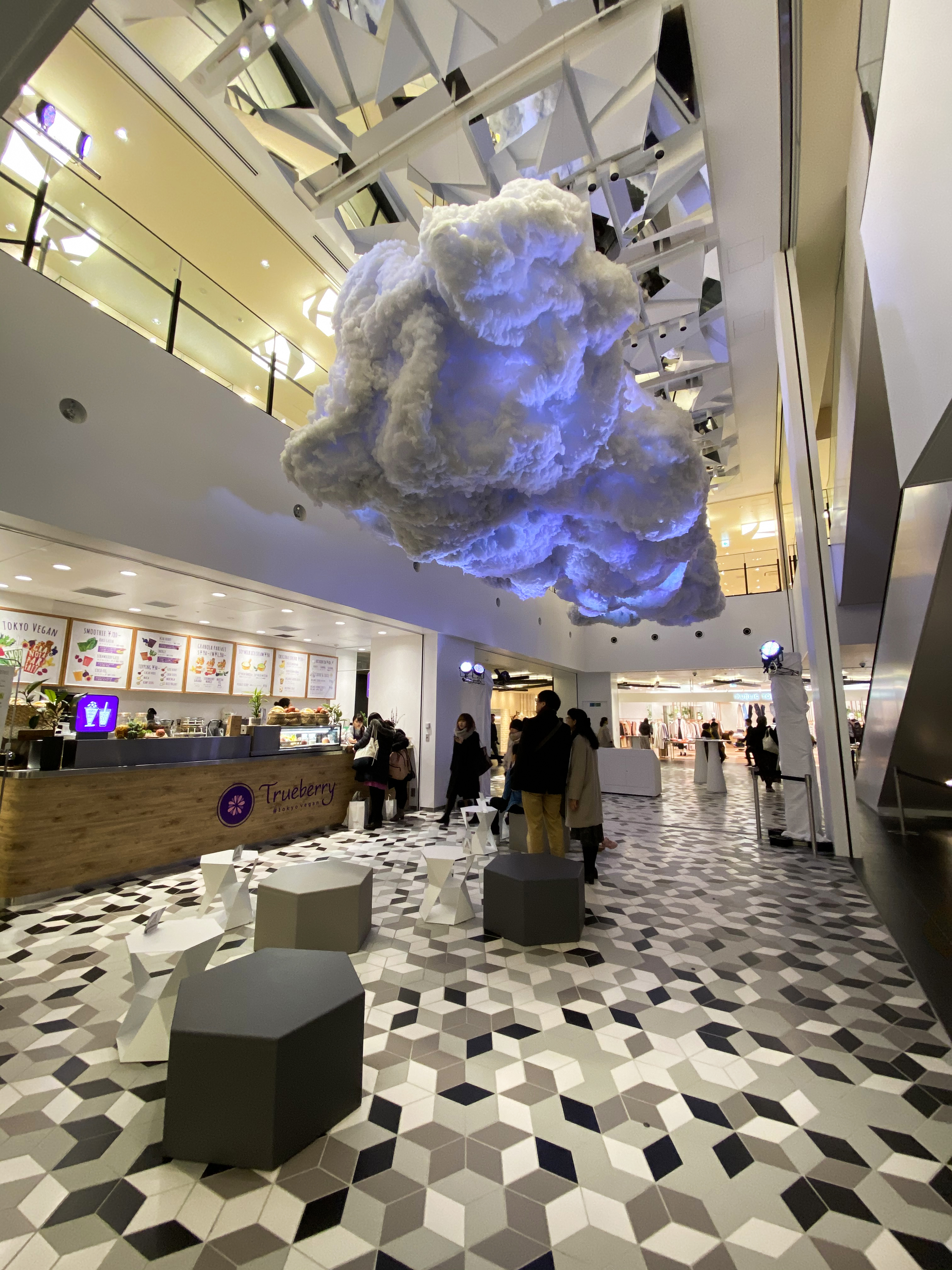
7th floor atrium

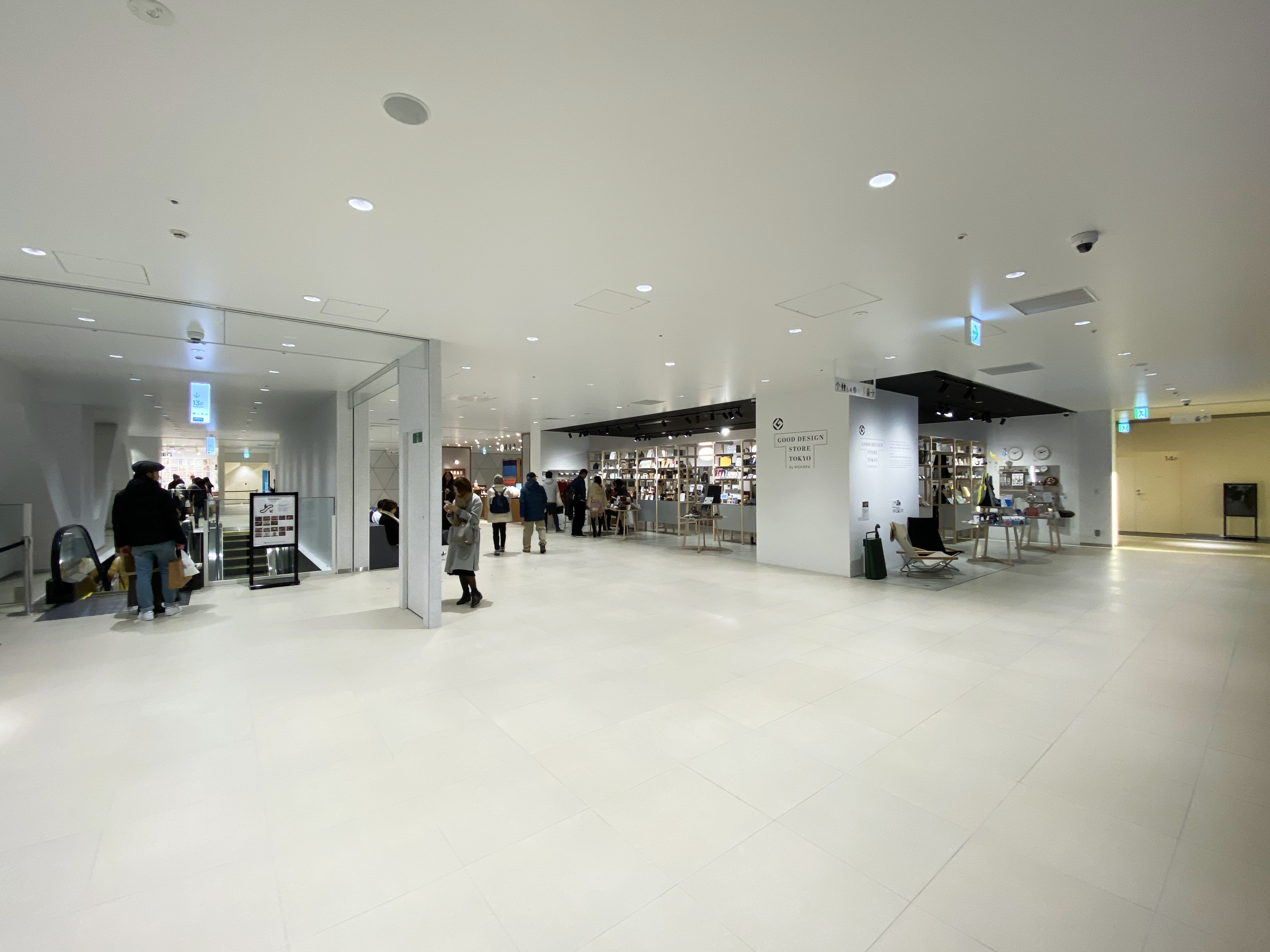
14th floor

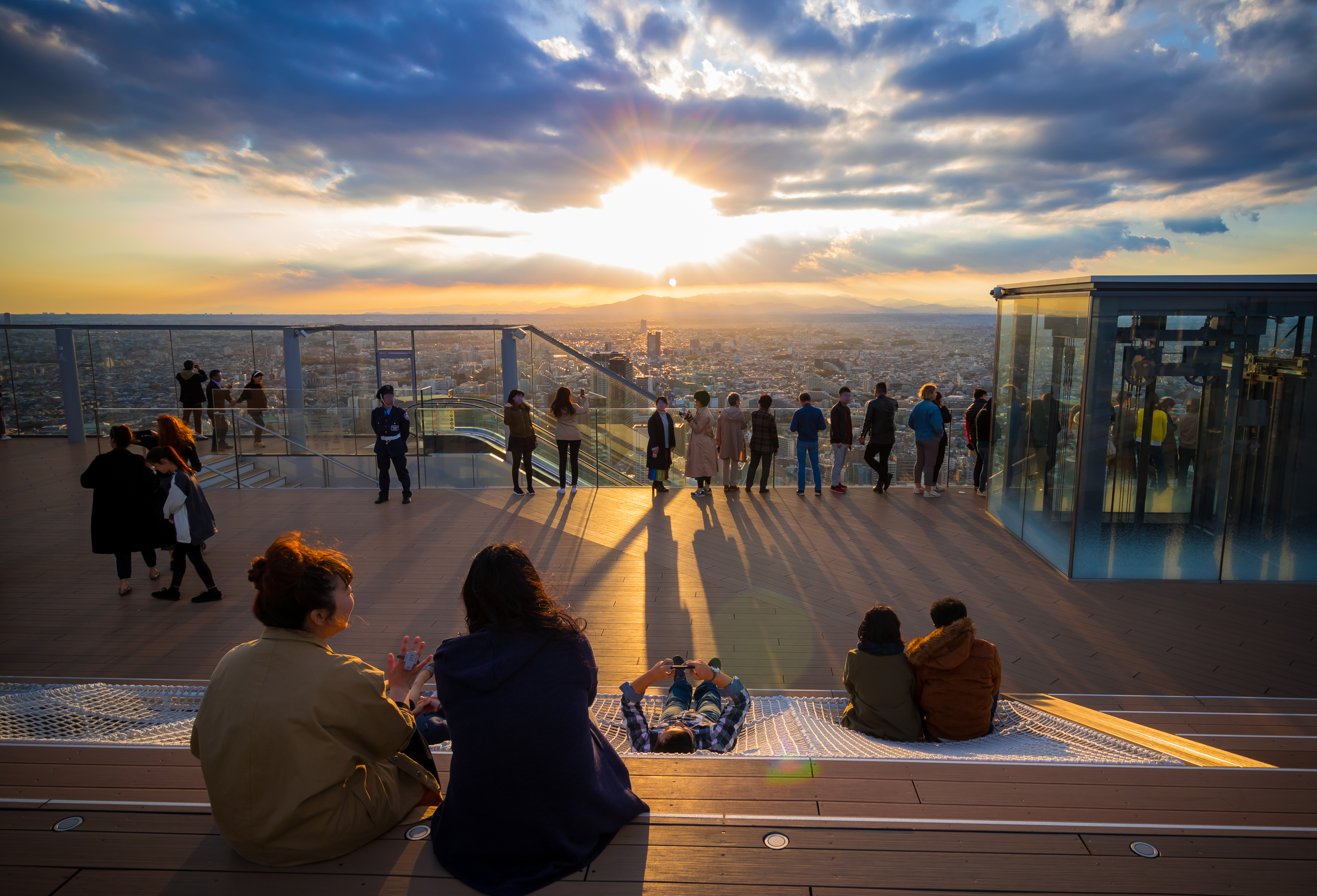
Shibuya Sky observation deck
