= Ikejiri-ōhashi Station =

Railway station in Tokyo, Japan

Coordinates: 35.6505°N 139.6845°E

Ikejiri-ōhashi Station 池尻大橋駅

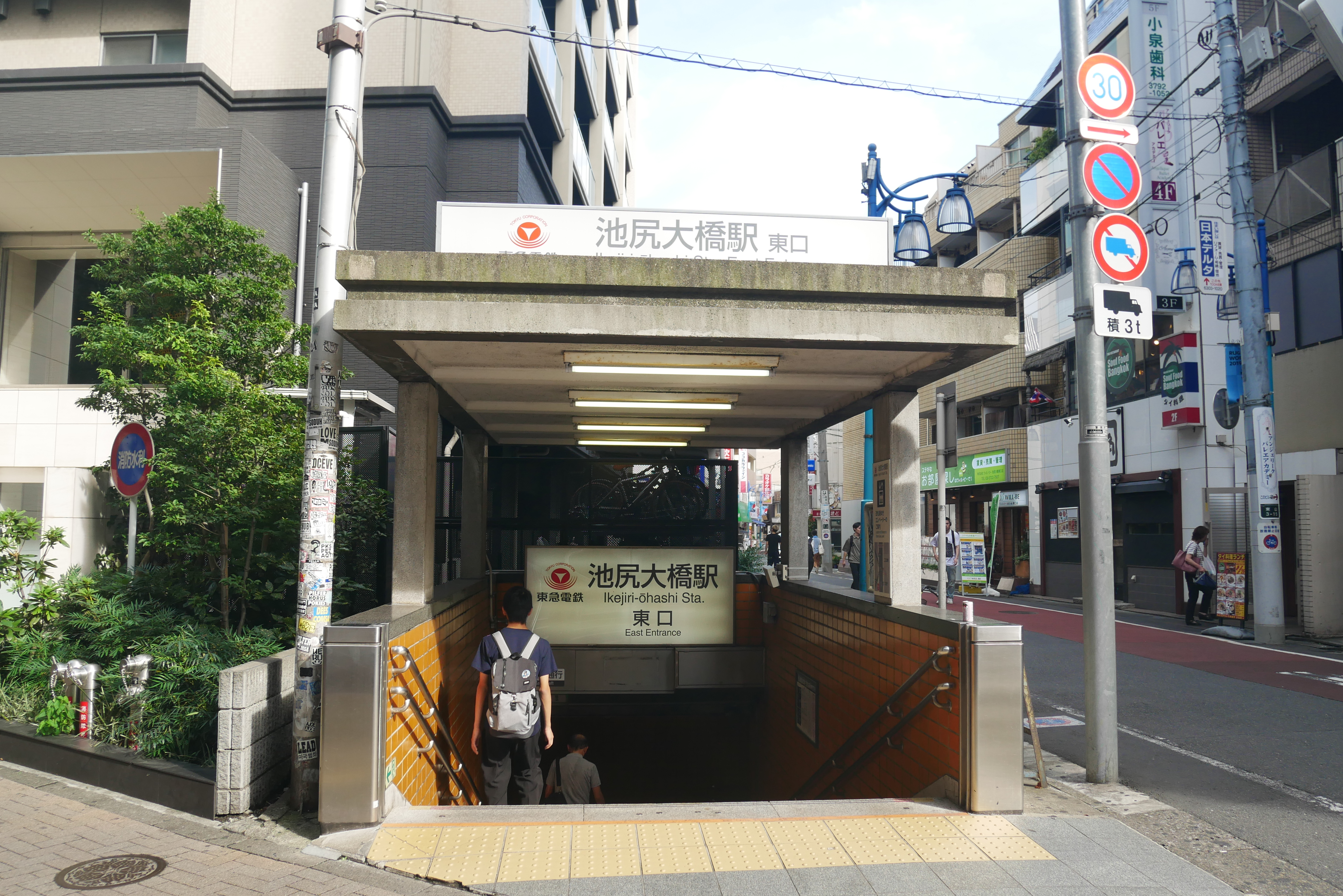
- East exit, 2019

General information
- Location: 3-chōme, Ikejiri, Setagaya Special Ward, Tokyo （東京都世田谷区池尻３丁目） Japan
- Operator: Tōkyū Railways
- Line: Den-en-toshi Line
- Platforms: 2 side platforms
- Tracks: 2
- Connections: Bus stop

Construction
- Structure type: Underground

Other information
- Station code: DT02

History
- Opened: 7 April 1977; 49 years ago

Services
Preceding station	Tōkyū Railways	Following station
Sangen-jaya towards Chūō-rinkan	Den-en-toshi Line Semi-Express Local	Shibuya Terminus
Location
- Location within Special wards of Tokyo Location within Tokyo Bay and Bōsō Peninsula Location within Tokyo Location within Japan

Ikejiri-ōhashi Station (池尻大橋駅, Ikejiri-ōhashi-eki) is a railway station on the Tokyu Den-en-toshi Line extending through Setagaya, Tokyo and Meguro, Tokyo, Japan. It is operated by the private railway operator Tokyu Corporation. Ikejiri-ōhashi station is the easternmost station in Setagaya. The station number is DT-02.

== Station layout ==
The station consists of two underground side platforms.

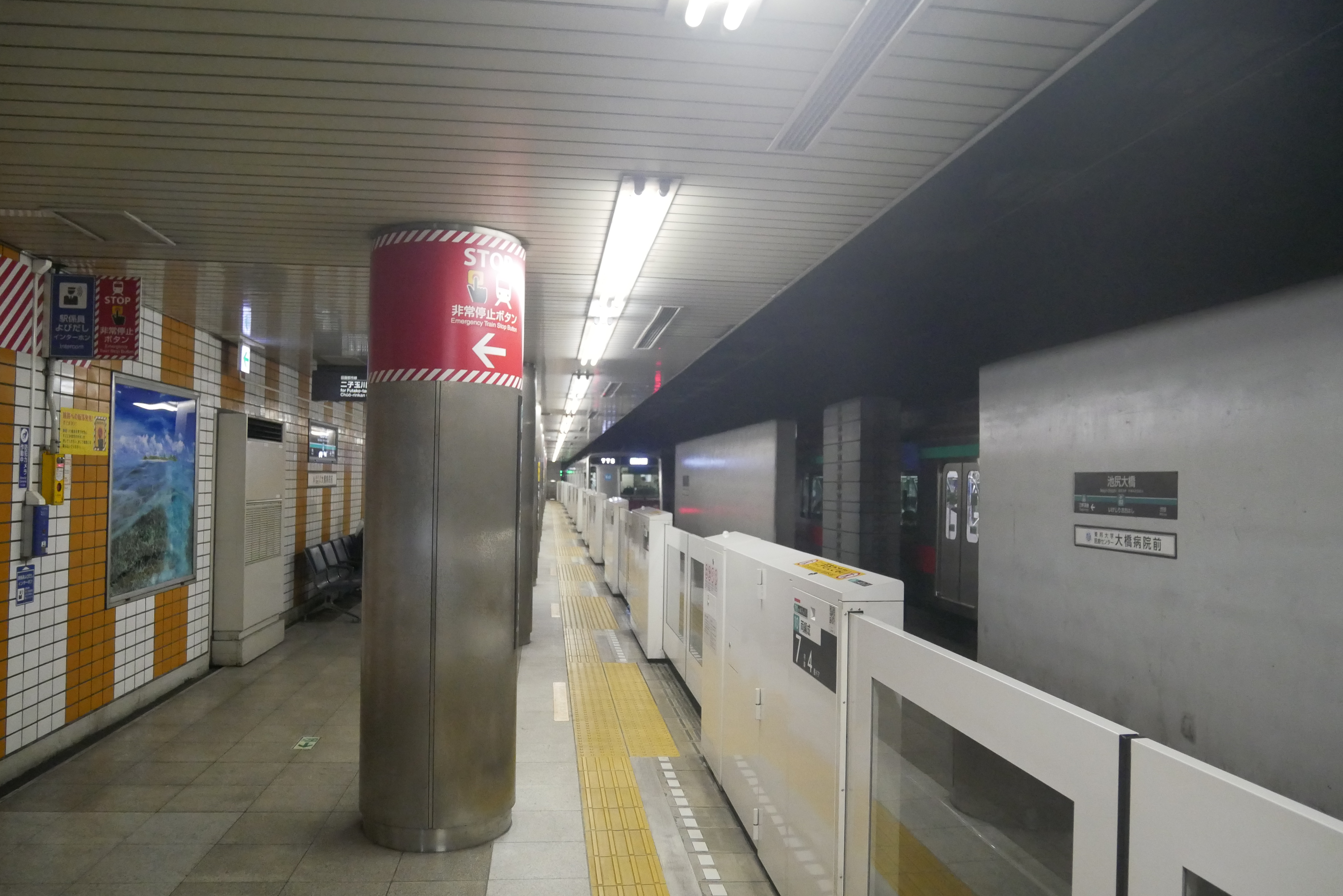
The platform level, 2019

=== Platforms ===
1	Tokyu Den-en-toshi Line	for Futako-tamagawa, Mizonokuchi, Nagatsuta, and Chūō-rinkan
2	Tokyu Den-en-toshi Line	for Shibuya; Tokyo Metro Hanzomon Line for Oshiage; Tobu Skytree Line for Tōbu-Dōbutsu-Kōen; Tobu Isesaki Line for Kuki; Tobu Nikko Line for Minami-Kurihashi

== History ==
The station opened on April 7, 1977.

In the 2015 data available from Japan’s Ministry of Land, Infrastructure, Transport and Tourism, Ikejiri-Ōhashi → Shibuya was one of the train segments among Tokyo's most crowded train lines during rush hour.
