= Carrot Tower =

Building in Tokyo, Japan

Coordinates: 35.64376°N 139.66908°E

- キャロットタワー
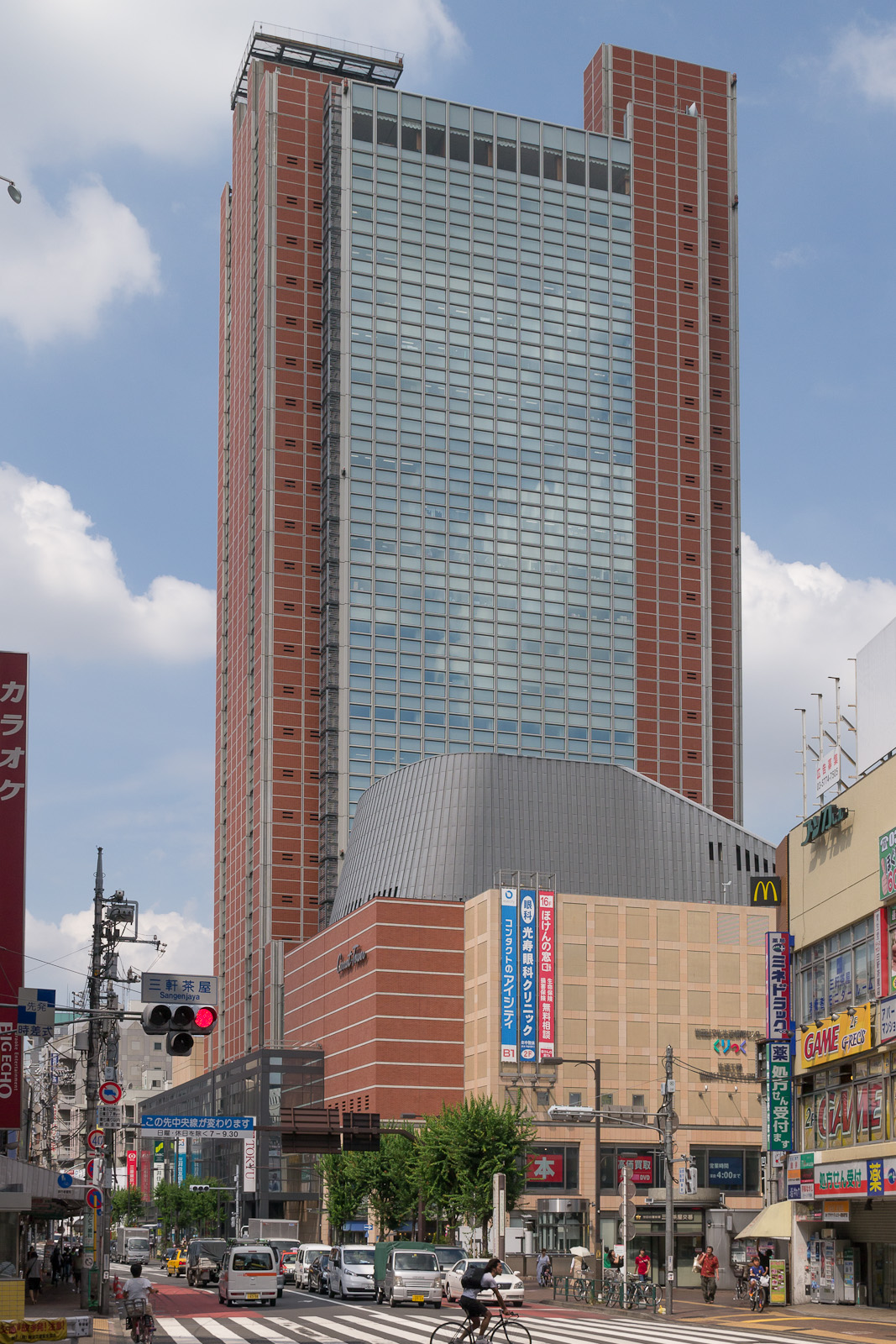
- Interactive map of the Carrot Tower area

General information
- Status: Completed
- Location: 4 Chome-1-1 Taishido, Setagaya City, Tokyo 154-0004, Japan
- Construction started: March 1993
- Completed: November 1996

Technical details
- Floor area: 76,754.48 m^{2}
- Lifts/elevators: 10

Design and construction
- Architect: Ishimoto Architects

Other information
- Parking: 284

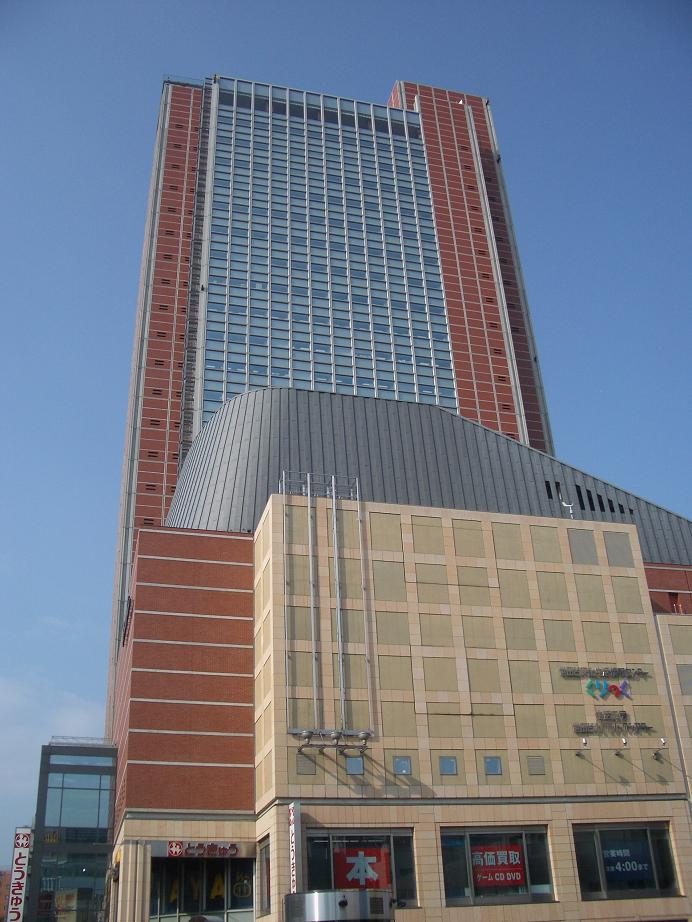
Carrot Tower

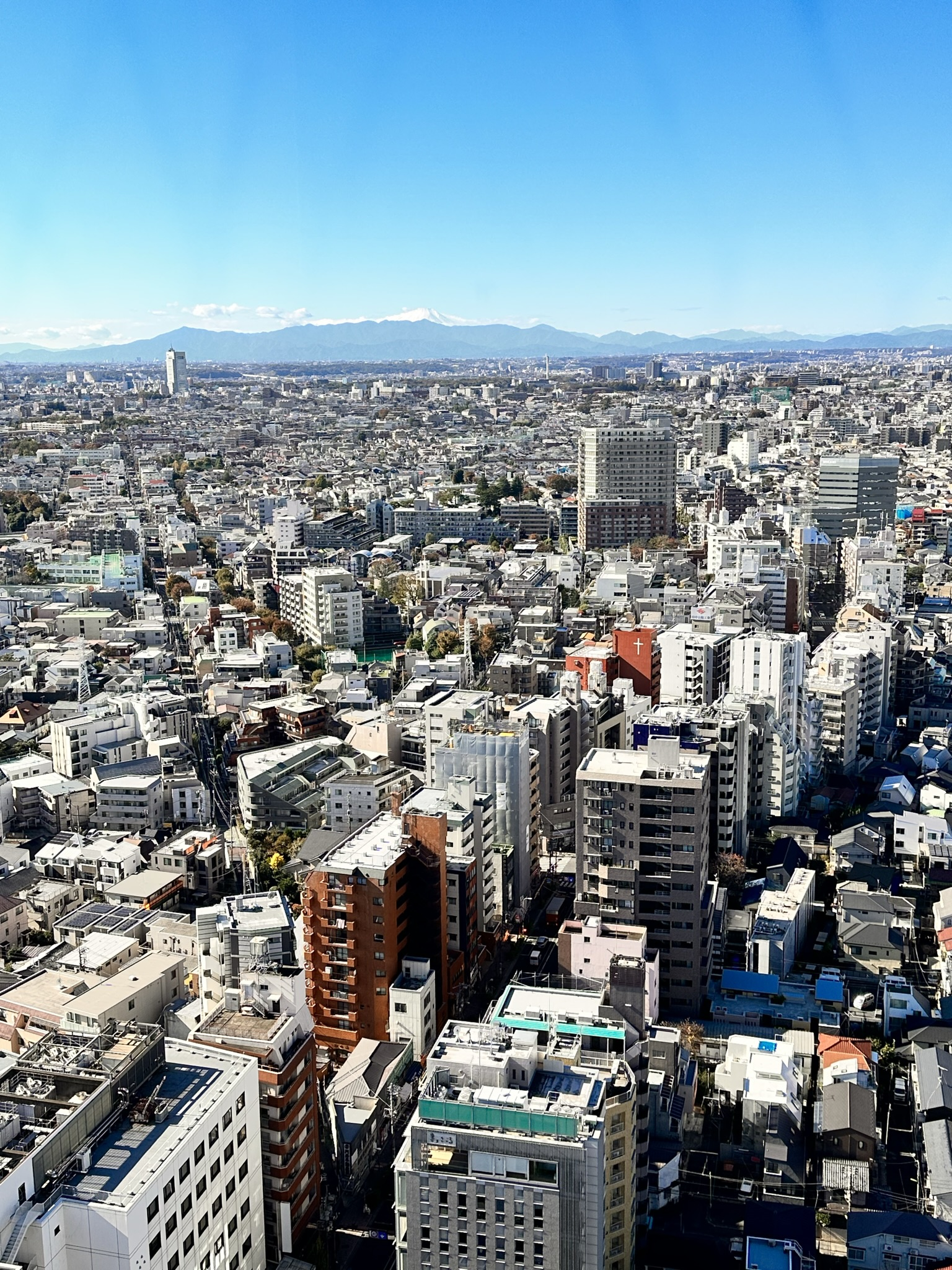
View from observation deck, looking west

The Carrot Tower (キャロットタワー, Kyarotto Tawā) is a high-rise commercial building located in Sangen-jaya, Setagaya, Tokyo, Japan. It was completed in November 1996. The building has 26 stories above ground and 5 basement levels. Its name was the winning entry in a competition among local children.

The upper levels have office space, while the lower stories contain shops, a gallery, and a public theatre. The top floor has an observation deck along with a banquet area and restaurant. It also houses a broadcasting studio of the local FM Setagaya radio station.

The game development company Game Freak hosted their headquarters on the 22nd floor of the Carrot Tower until transferring to Kanda Square in 2020. The site on the 22nd floor still serves as an alternative site development studio for Game Freak today.

Sangen-Jaya Station on the Tōkyū Setagaya Line is integrated into the ground floor.
