= Shimo-takaido Station =

Railway and tram station in Tokyo, Japan

Coordinates: 35°39′58″N 139°38′29″E

Shimo-takaido Station 下高井戸駅

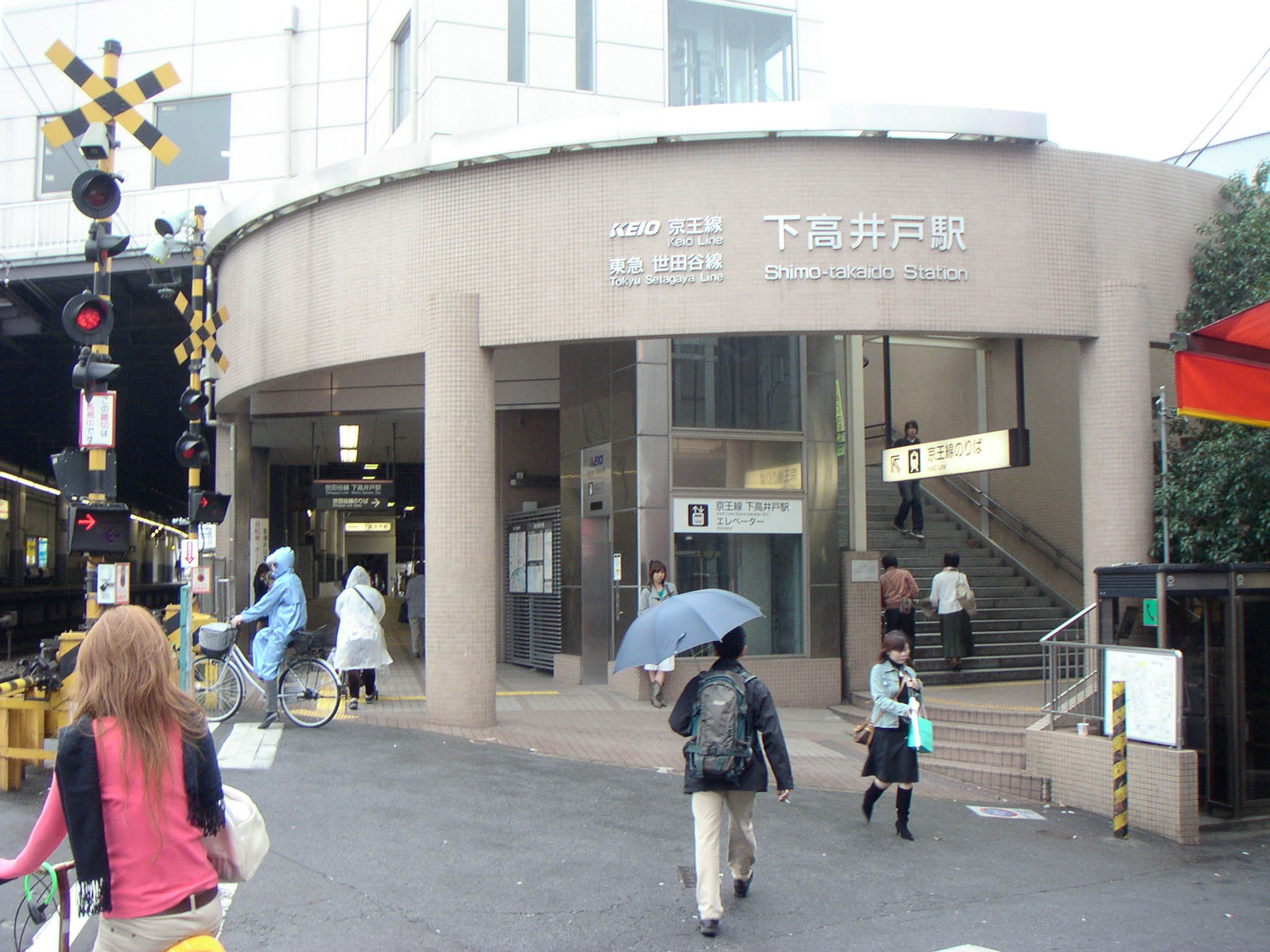
- Station entrance shared by Keio and Tokyu

General information
- Location: 3-29-17 Matsubara, Setagaya, Tokyo; Japan
- Operator: Keio Corporation; Tōkyū Railways
- Lines: Keiō Line; Setagaya Line
- Connections: Bus stop

Other information
- Station code: KO07 (Keiō Line); SG10 (Tōkyū Setagaya Line)

History
- Opened: 15 April 1913; 113 years ago
- Former names: Nichidai-mae (1938-1944, Keio)

Services
Preceding station	Keio Corporation	Following station
Sakurajōsui towards Keiō-hachiōji	Keiō Line Rapid Local	Meidaimae towards Shinjuku
Preceding station	Tōkyū Railways	Following station
Terminus	Setagaya Line	Matsubara towards Sangen-jaya
Location
- Location within Special wards of Tokyo Location within Tokyo Bay and Bōsō Peninsula Location within Tokyo Location within Japan

Shimo-takaido Station (下高井戸駅, Shimo-takaido-eki) is a railway station on the Keiō Line and Tōkyū Setagaya Line in Setagaya, Tokyo, Japan, operated by the private railway operators Keio Corporation and Tokyu Corporation.

== Lines ==
Shimo-takaido Station is served by the Keiō Line from Shinjuku and the Tokyu Setagaya Line.

== Station layout ==
=== Keio platforms ===
1	Keiō Line	for Chōfu and Keiō-Hachiōji; Keiō Sagamihara Line for Hashimoto (via Chōfu); Keiō Takao Line for Takaosanguchi (via Kitano)
2	Keiō Line	for Meidaimae, Sasazuka, and Shinjuku; Keiō New Line for Shinjuku; Toei Shinjuku Line for Moto-Yawata

=== Tokyu platforms ===
The Tokyu station has one track serving a bay platform.

1	Tokyu Setagaya Line	for Yamashita, Kamimachi, and Sangen-jaya
2	Tokyu Setagaya Line	Disembarking only

== History ==
The Keio Line station opened on 15 April 1913. The Tokyu station opened on 1 May 1925.

In the 2015 data available from Japan’s Ministry of Land, Infrastructure, Transport and Tourism, Shimo-takaido → Meidaimae of the Keio line was one of the train segments among Tokyo's most crowded train lines during rush hour.
