= Tokyu 300 series =

Japanese tram type

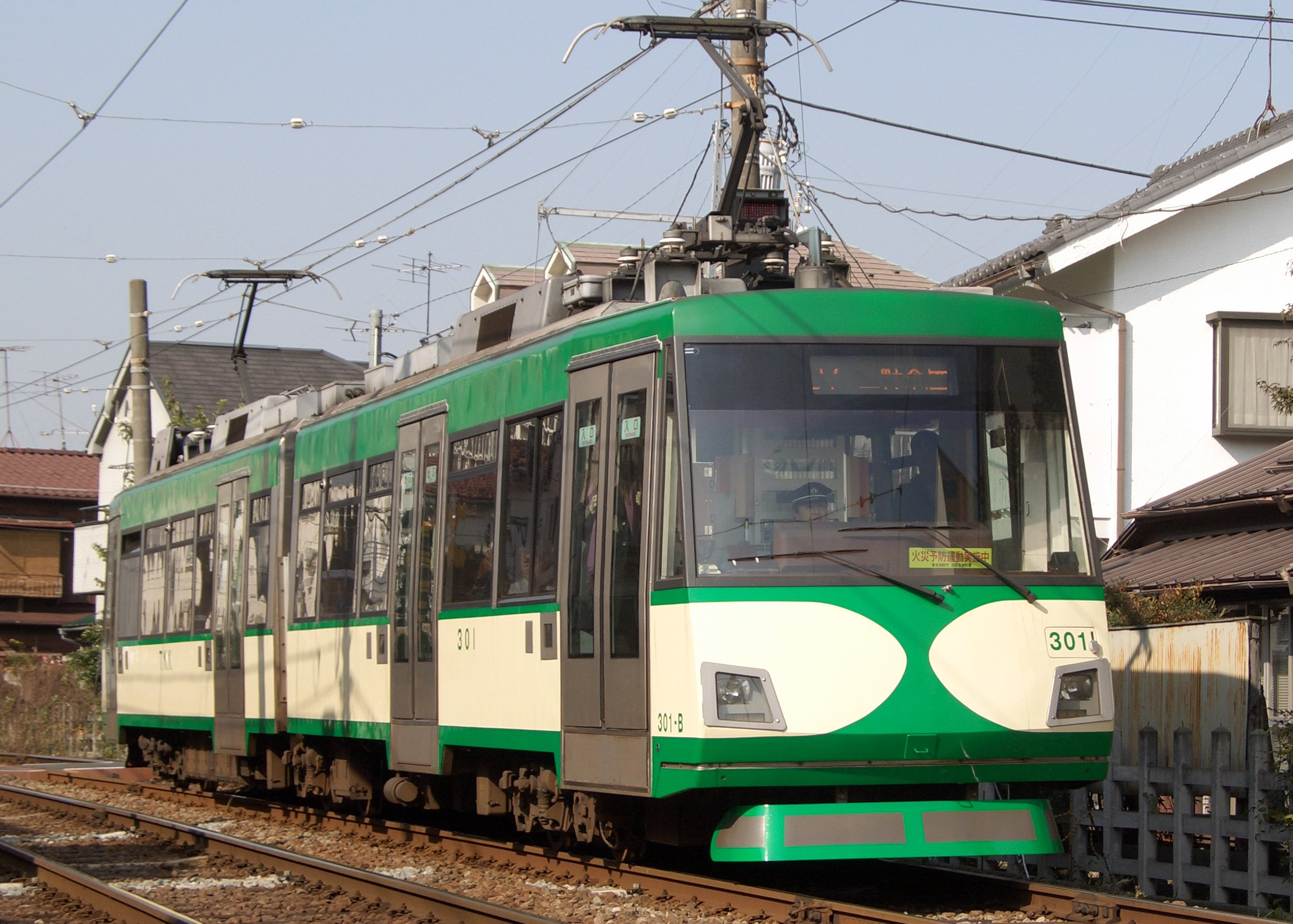
- 300 series set 301 in 2005
- In service: 1999-Present
- Manufacturer: Tokyu Car Corporation
- Replaced: DeHa 200 series; DeHa 80 series; DeHa 150 series; DeHa 70 series
- Constructed: 1999–2001
- Entered service: 11 July 1999
- Number built: 20 vehicles (10 sets)
- Number in service: 20 vehicles (10 sets)
- Formation: 2 articulated cars per tramset
- Fleet numbers: 300-301 – 300-310
- Operator: Tokyu Corporation
- Line served: Tokyu Setagaya Line

Specifications
- Train length: 23,980 mm (78 ft 8 in)
- Width: 2,500 mm (8 ft 2 in)
- Doors: 4 pairs per side
- Maximum speed: 40 km/h (25 mph)
- Traction system: IGBT-VVVF
- Acceleration: 3.0 km/(h⋅s) (1.9 mph/s)
- Deceleration: 4.4 km/(h⋅s) (2.7 mph/s) (service); 5.0 km/(h⋅s) (3.1 mph/s) (emergency)
- Electric system: 600 V DC overhead lines
- Current collection: Pantograph
- Track gauge: 1,372 mm (4 ft 6 in)

The Tokyu 300 series (東急300系, Tōkyū 300-kei) is a series of articulated trams built by Tokyu Car Corporation in 1999 for the Tōkyū Setagaya Line.

== Technical specifications ==
The trains are 23,980 mm (78 ft 8 in) long, 2,500 mm (8 ft 2 in) wide, and feature an IGBT-VVVF inverter system.

== History ==
The trains entered revenue service on 11 July 1999. They replaced the older DeHa 200 series, DeHa 80 series, DeHa 150 series, and DeHa 70 series.

== Livery variations ==
In commemoration of the 110th anniversary of the Tamagawa Electric Railway in April 2017, set 305 received a special wrapping. For the 50th anniversary of the Setagaya Line in May 2019, set 308 received a cat-themed wrapping.

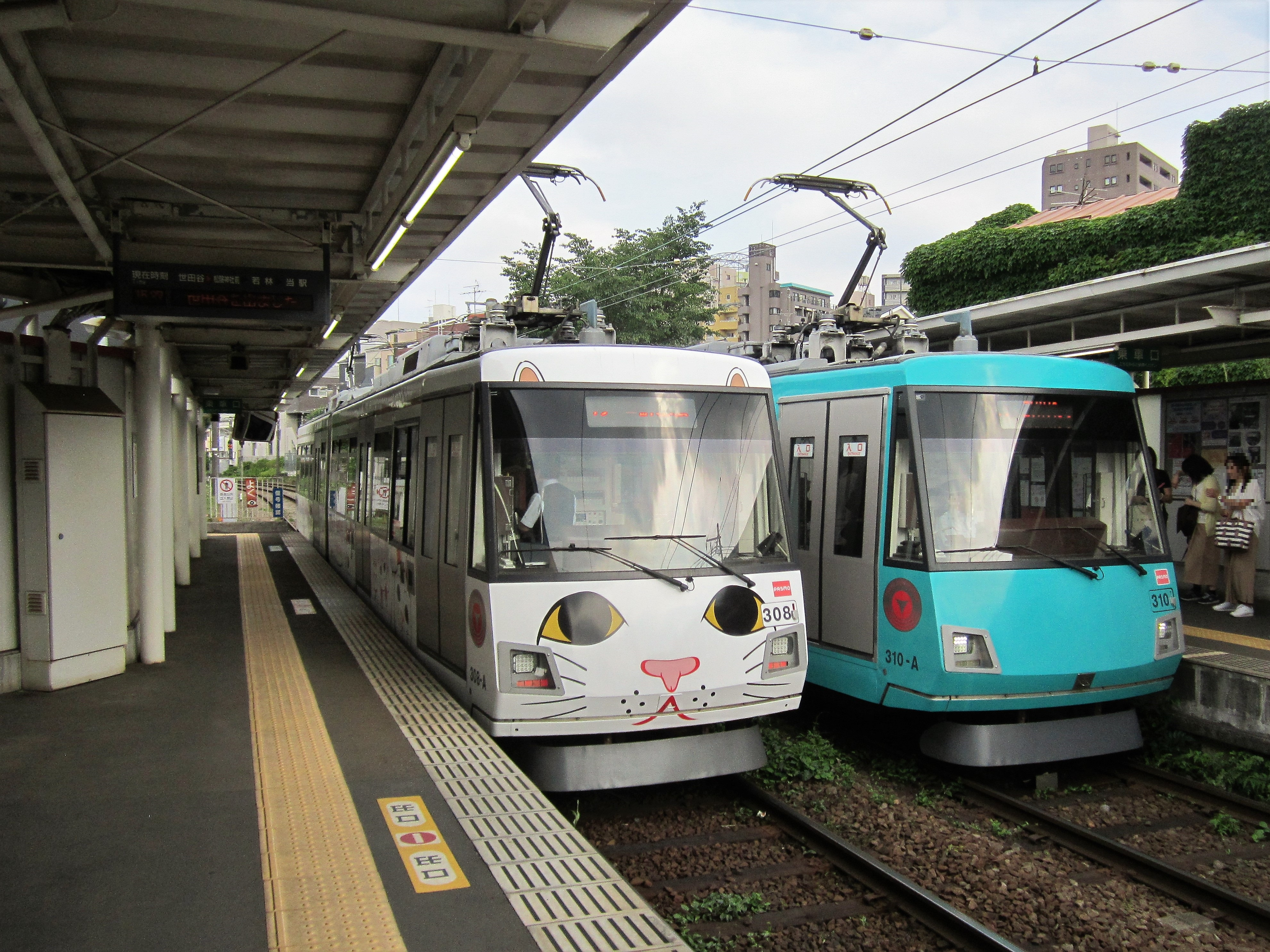
Sets 308 & 310 at Nishi-taishidō Station in 2019

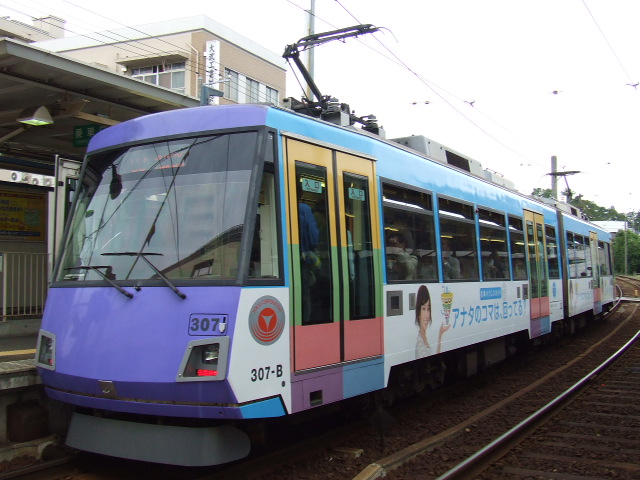
Set 307 in 2007

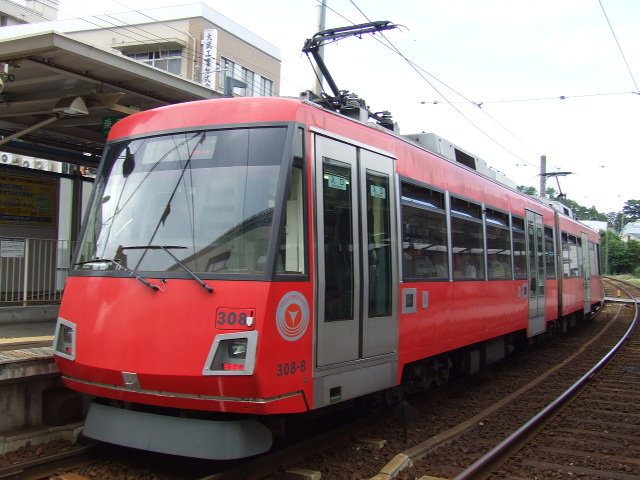
Set 308 in 2007

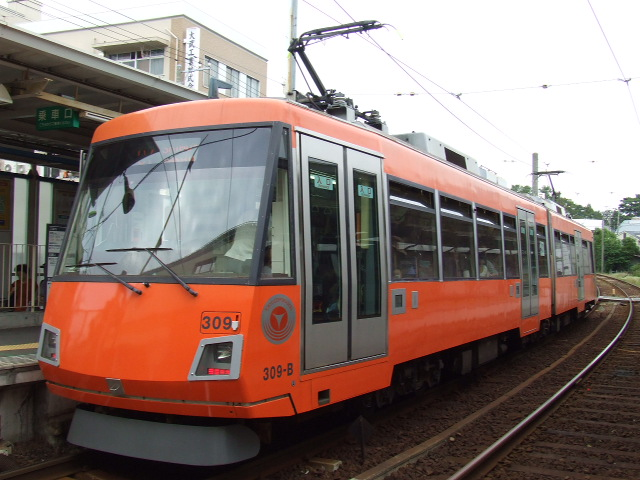
Set 309 in 2007

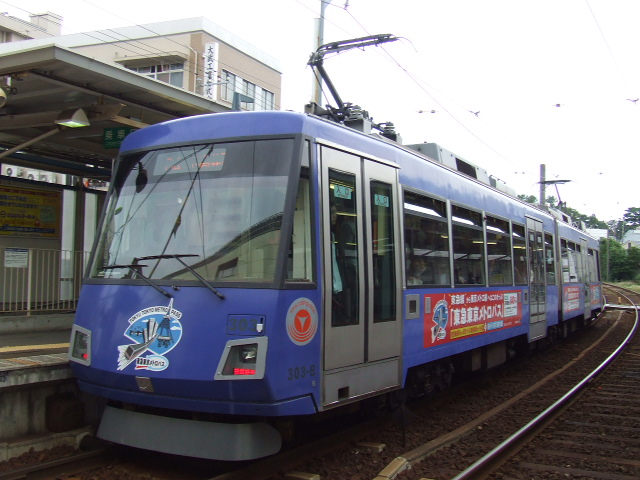
Set 303 in 2007

From 10 April 2022, a 300 series set is due to receive a special livery to commemorate the 100th anniversary of Tokyu Corporation's founding.
