= Cerulean Tower =

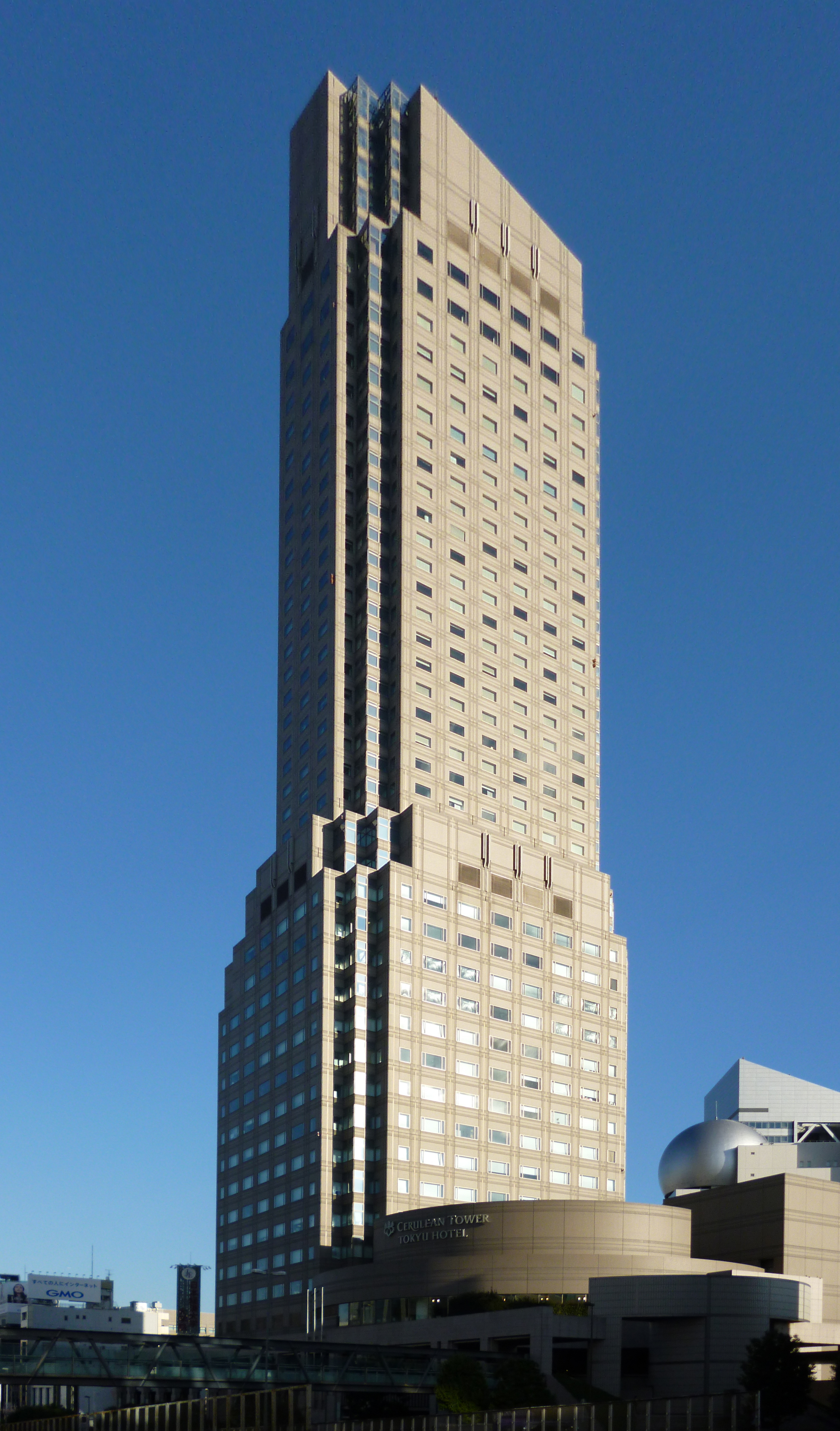
- Interactive map of the Cerulean Tower area

General information
- Status: Completed
- Type: Office
- Location: Shibuya, Tokyo, Japan
- Coordinates: 35.65647°N 139.69947°E
- Completed: 2001

Height
- Roof: 184 m (604 ft)

Technical details
- Floor count: 47

Design and construction
- Developer: Tokyu Construction

The Cerulean Tower (セルリアンタワー, Serurian Tawā) is a skyscraper in Shibuya, Tokyo, Japan. It was completed in March 2001, and opened in April. It was built using empty lots formerly occupied by the headquarters of Tokyu Corporation. It is 184 metres tall and has 41 floors as well as 6 underground floors. The building covers a total ground area of 106,000 m^{2}. It was the tallest building in the Shibuya station area until the opening of Shibuya Scramble Square in 2019.

The two main materials used in the building's construction were glass and steel.

The Tower has both office space and a hotel, the Cerulean Tower Tokyu Hotel.

View over Shibuya from 34F of Cerulean Tower

== Floor directory ==
Roof	40F (40th floor)	39F (39th floor)	38F (38th floor)	
Heliport (emergency use)	Tower's Restaurant & Bar	Tower's Salon	Residential floor	
19F - 37F (19th - 37th floors)	4F - 16F (4th - 16th floors)	3F (3rd floor)	2F (2nd floor)	
Guest Rooms (414)	Offices	Indoor pool, Fitness, Esthetique, Kid's Room, Teeth Care Salon	Japanese and Chinese Restaurant; Italian Restaurant; Jazz Club	
LBF (Lobby floor)	B1F (Basement floor)	B2F (2nd Basement floor)	B3F (3rd Basement floor)	B4F (4th Basement floor)
Lobby, Coffee Shop, Garden Lounge, Church	Small Banquet Rooms	Banquet Rooms; CERULEAN TOWER NOH THEATRE	Parking	Parking
