= Sangen-jaya Station =

Railway and tram station in Tokyo, Japan

Sangen-jaya Station 三軒茶屋駅

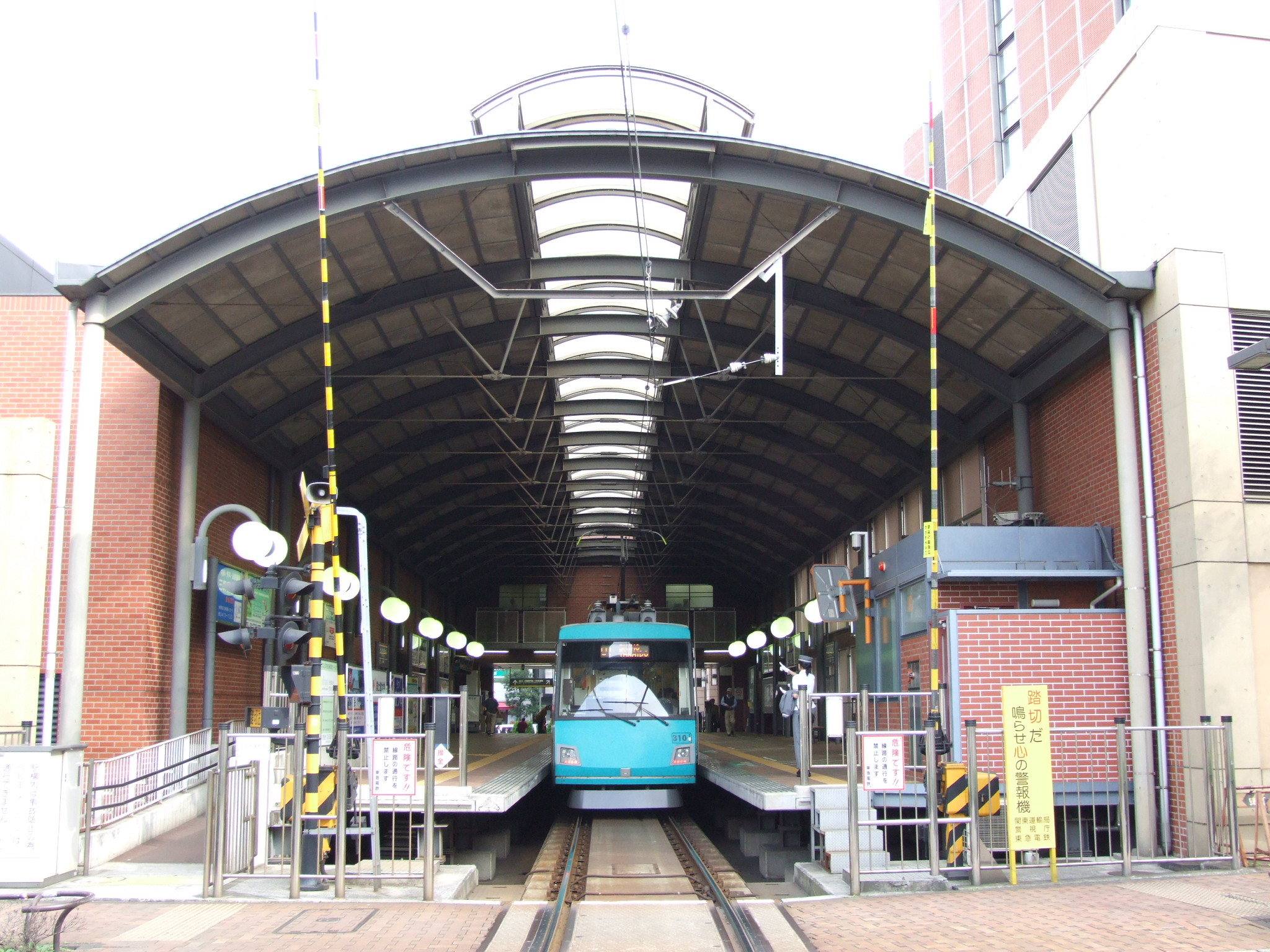
- Setagaya Line terminal

General information
- Location: 2-15 Taishidō, Setagaya Special Ward, Tokyo; Japan
- Coordinates: 35.643515°N 139.671162°E
- Operator: Tōkyū Railways
- Lines: Den-en-toshi Line; Setagaya Line
- Platforms: 2 side platforms, bay platform
- Tracks: 3

Construction
- Structure type: Underground (Den-en-toshi Line); At grade (Setagaya Line)

Other information
- Station code: DT03, SG01

History
- Opened: 6 March 1907; 119 years ago

Services
Preceding station	Tōkyū Railways	Following station
Futako-tamagawa towards Chūō-rinkan	Den-en-toshi Line Express	Shibuya Terminus
Komazawa-daigaku towards Chūō-rinkan	Den-en-toshi Line Semi Express Local	Ikejiri-ōhashi towards Shibuya
Nishi-taishidō towards Shimo-takaido	Setagaya Line	Terminus
Location
- Location within Special wards of Tokyo Location within Tokyo Bay and Bōsō Peninsula Location within Tokyo Location within Japan

Sangen-jaya Station (Japanese: 三軒茶屋駅, Hepburn: Sangenjaya-eki) is a railway station in Sangenjaya district, Setagaya ward, Tokyo, Japan, operated by the private railway operator Tokyu Corporation. It is located at the merging of two highways, National Route 246 and Setagaya-dori, just outside the central area of Shibuya. The station is the terminus of the Setagaya Line and is also served by the Den-en-toshi Line.

== Lines ==
Sangen-jaya Station is served by the Tokyu Den-en-toshi Line, and also forms the terminus of the Tokyu Setagaya Line.

== Layout ==
The two sections of the station are not adjacent to each other, and passengers wishing to transfer must walk between the two sections.

=== Den-en-toshi Line ===
The Den-en-toshi section is composed of two side platforms serving two tracks.

1	Tokyu Den-en-toshi Line	for Futako-tamagawa, Mizonokuchi, Nagatsuta, and Chūō-rinkan
2	Tokyu Den-en-toshi Line	for Shibuya; Tokyo Metro Hanzomon Line for Oshiage; Tobu Skytree Line for Tōbu-Dōbutsu-Kōen; Tobu Isesaki Line for Kuki; Tobu Nikko Line for Minami-kurihashi

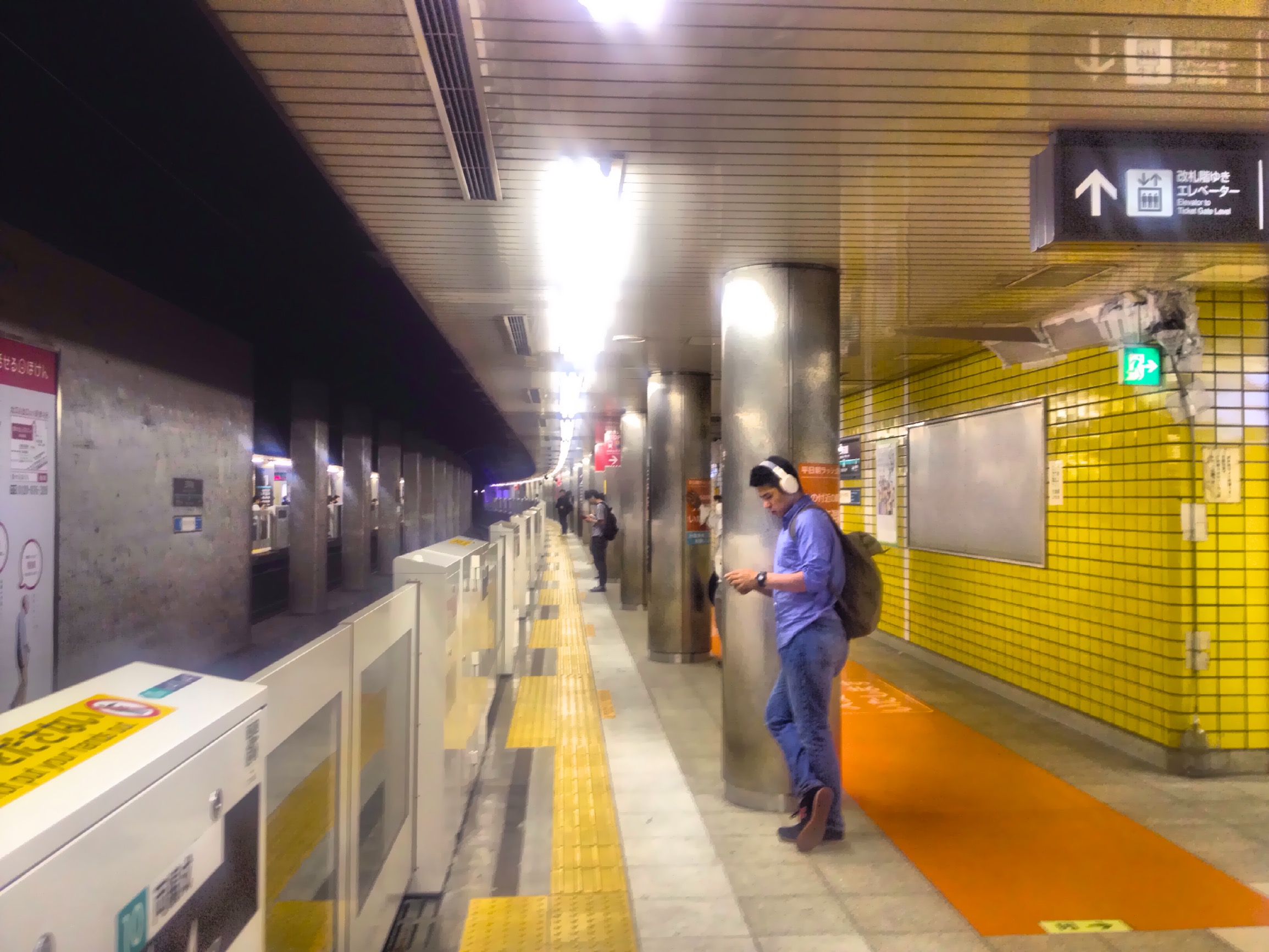
Den-en-toshi Line platforms, 2018

=== Setagaya Line ===
The Setagaya section is composed of a bay platform serving a single track. The two sides of the platform are treated as separate platforms.

1	Tokyu Setagaya Line	for Kamimachi, Yamashita, and Shimo-takaido
2	Tokyu Setagaya Line	Disembarking only

== History ==
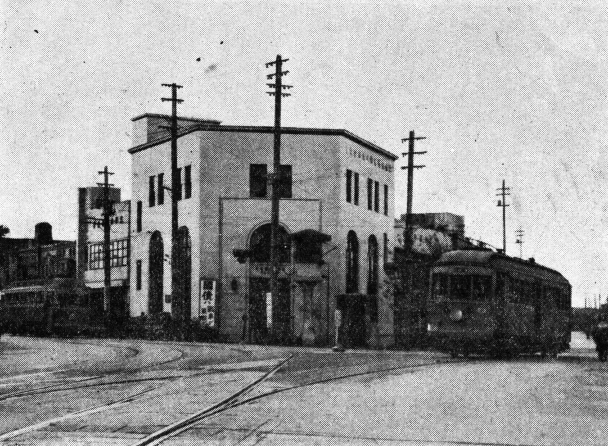
The station in the 1940s.

On 6 March 1907 (119 years ago), Sangen-jaya initially opened as a station on the Tamagawa line.

Sangen-jaya Station History Major Events
Date	Event
1907-03-06	Tamagawa Line opens, and the station opens.
1925-01-18	Setagaya Line opens.
1969-05-10	Tamagawa Line closes.
1977-04-07	Shin-Tamagawa Line (present Tōkyū Den-en-toshi Line) opens.

== Surrounding area ==
- National Route 246
- Carrot Tower

== In popular culture ==
The area is the basis for a district called Yongen-Jaya in the video game Persona 5 and its spin-offs, just outside of Shibuya. The town was modeled after Sangen-jaya, and shares part of the same name.

== See also ==
- List of railway stations in Japan
