= Setagaya Line =

Tram line in Tokyo, Japan

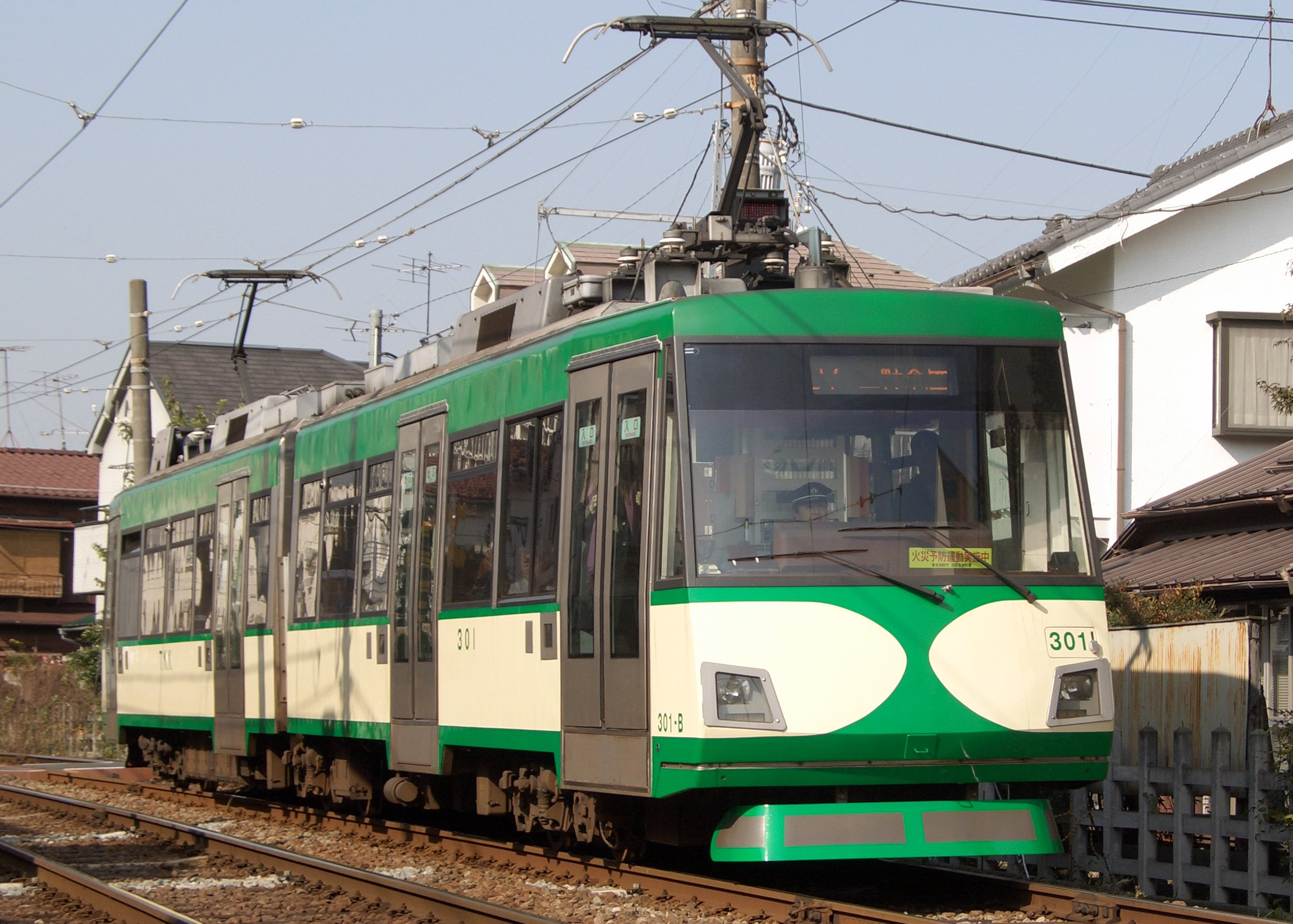
- A Tokyu 300 series trainset in November 2005

Overview
- Native name: 世田谷線
- Status: In service
- Owner: Tokyu Corporation
- Locale: Setagaya, Tokyo
- Termini: Sangen-jaya; Shimo-takaido
- Stations: 10

Service
- Type: Light rail (tramway)
- System: Tokyu Railways
- Route number: SG
- Operator: Tokyu Corporation
- Rolling stock: Tokyu 300 series
- Daily ridership: 57,541 (2017)

History
- Opened: January 18, 1925

Technical
- Line length: 5 km (3.1 mi)
- Number of tracks: 2
- Track gauge: 1,372 mm (4 ft 6 in)
- Electrification: Overhead line, 600 V DC
- Operating speed: 40 km/h (25 mph)
Route map

Setagaya Line train running on the tracks, 2017

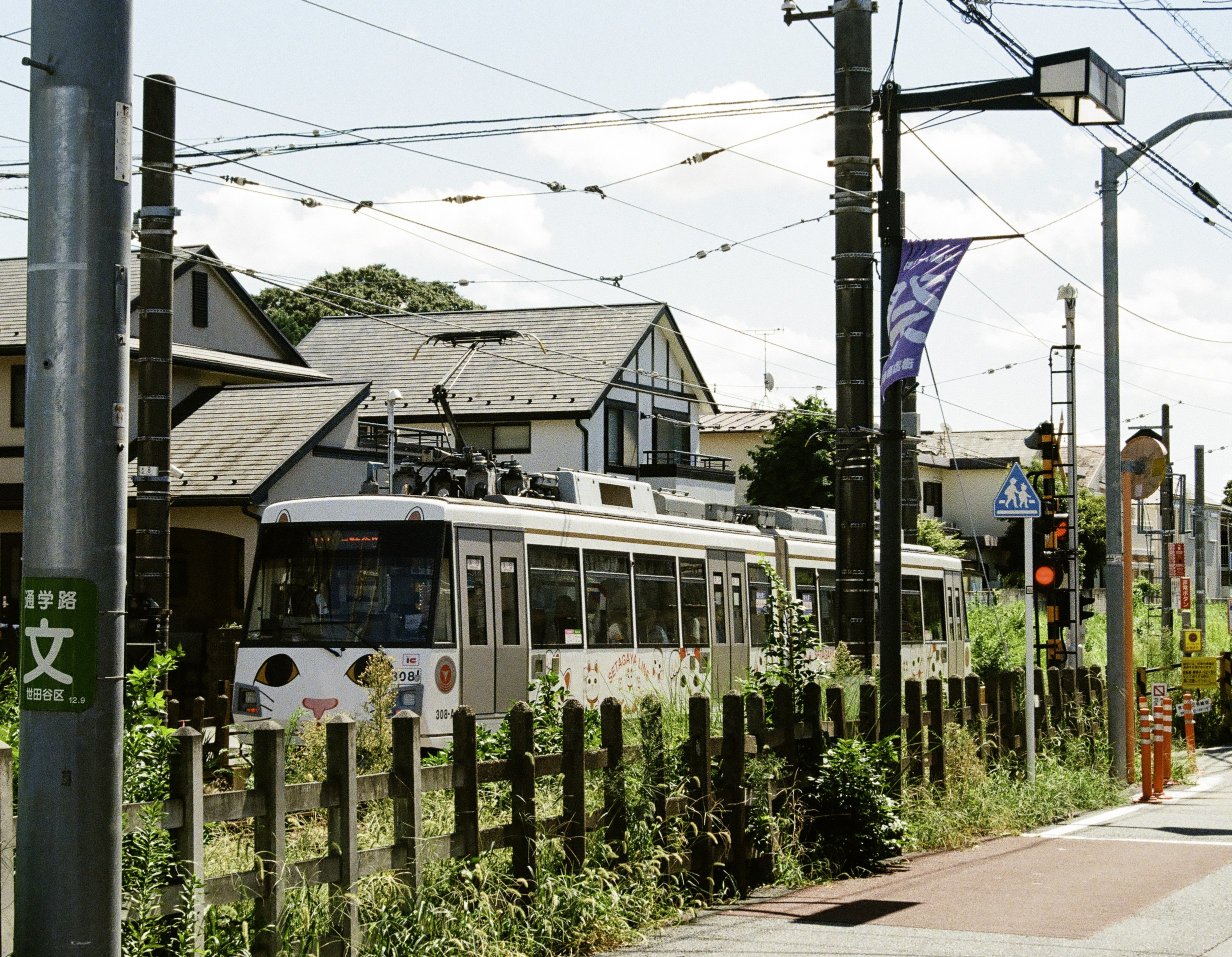
Tokyu 308 train painted in the Manekineko theme

The Setagaya Line (Japanese: 世田谷線, Hepburn: Setagaya-sen) is a light rail line in Tokyo, Japan, operated by Tokyu Corporation. It connects Sangen-jaya to Shimo-takaido in Setagaya, Tokyo.

Unlike other Tokyu lines that are heavy rail commuter lines, the Setagaya Line is governed under the Tramways Act (軌道法, kidou-hou) of the Japanese government. Despite this, the entire line is located on its own right-of-way because it is a branch line of the former Tamagawa Line (玉川線), which is not the same line as the present-day Tōkyū Tamagawa Line.

== Overview ==
The Setagaya Line was opened by the Tamagawa Electric Railway (玉川電気鉄道, Tamagawa Denki Tetsudō; "Tamaden") in 1923, running on surface streets between Shibuya and the Tama River. Since the railway merged with Tokyu in 1938, the balance of the line closed in 1969, leaving this isolated section as the sole Tokyu line to use 1,372 mm (4 ft 6 in) gauge.

The Setagaya Line and the Toden Arakawa Line (the only surviving line of the former Tokyo Toden network) are the only railway lines in Tokyo proper to be legally classified as tramways (軌道, kidō).

The line had its own smart card system called Setamaru, which cannot be used on other Tokyu lines. Since March 2007, the PASMO contactless card has also been accepted on the Setagaya and other Tokyu lines. The smart card system was abolished and merged with PASMO in 2012.

On the line, there is a pair of themed trains in operation, called the “Kofuku-no-Manekineko Densha” (the beckoning cat of good fortune train), to honour the Gotoku-ji temple, that is located between the Yamashita and the Miyanosaka stops.

== History ==
The line was opened in 1925 as a branch line of the Tōkyū Tamagawa Line. Most of the Tamagawa line was closed and replaced by subways in 1969, although the line was renamed to Setagaya Line and kept in service. Although most of the line was closed due to it running on roads, causing traffic congestions, Setagaya line barely had any sections running on roads, contributing to it staying open. The line was separated from other lines owned by Tokyu until the Den-en-toshi Line opened in 1977.

== Network and operations ==
Trains service the line from 4am to 12am, with an interval of 5-20 minutes. All trains stop at all stations.

=== Stations ===
All stations are located in Setagaya.

No.	Picture	Station	Distance in km (mi)	Transfers	Passengers (2022)
SG-01		Sangen-jaya 三軒茶屋	0.0 (0)	Den-en-toshi Line (DT03)	124,990
SG-02		Nishi-taishidō 西太子堂	0.3 (0.19)		734
SG-03		Wakabayashi 若林	0.9 (0.56)		7,606
SG-04		Shōin-jinja-mae 松陰神社前	1.4 (0.87)		9,531
SG-05		Setagaya 世田谷	1.8 (1.1)		7,592
SG-06		Kamimachi 上町	2.2 (1.4)		8,814
SG-07		Miyanosaka 宮の坂	2.7 (1.7)		4,002
SG-08		Yamashita 山下	3.4 (2.1)	Odawara Line (Gōtokuji: OH10)	7,784
SG-09		Matsubara 松原	4.2 (2.6)		3,113
SG-10		Shimo-takaido 下高井戸	5.0 (3.1)	Keiō Line (KO07)	16,566
