= Tokyu Corporation =

Japanese railway/real estate/retail conglomerate

- Trade name: Tokyu, Tōkyū Dentetsu, Tōkyō Kyūkō (before 2006), TKK (from Tokyo Kyuko Kabushikigaisha)
- Native name: 東急株式会社
- Romanized name: Tōkyū kabushiki-gaisha
- Formerly: Tokyo Express Electric Railway (1942-2019)
- Type: Public
- Traded as: TYO: 9005; Nikkei 225 component
- Industry: Conglomerate
- Predecessor: Musashi Electric Railway; Meguro-Kamata Electric Railway
- Founded: May 16, 1910; 116 years ago (as Musashi Electric Railway Company; renamed Tokyo-Yokohama Electric Railway in October 25, 1924; 101 years ago); September 2, 1922; 104 years ago (Meguro-Kamata Electric Railway); October 16, 1939; 86 years ago (current iteration of company); Renamed Tokyu in May 1, 1942; 84 years ago
- Founder: Keita Goto
- Headquarters: 5-6 Nanpeidaichō, Shibuya-ku, Tokyo, Japan
- Area served: Tokyo and Kanagawa
- Key people: Hirofumi Nomoto (Chairman); Masahiro Horie (President)
- Services: Passenger railways Other related services
- Owner: MTBJ investment trusts (8.04%); Dai-ichi Life (5.55%); Custody Bank of Japan investment trusts (4.32%); Nippon Life (3.89%); SMTB (3.70%)
- Parent: Tokyu Group
- Website: www.tokyu.co.jp

Tokyu Railways Company, Ltd.
- Trade name: Tokyu, Tōkyū Dentetsu, Tōkyō Kyūkō (before 2006), TKK (from Tokyo Kyuko Kabushikigaisha)
- Native name: 東急電鉄株式会社
- Romanized name: Tōkyū Dentetsu kabushiki gaisha
- Type: Subsidiary
- Industry: Private railroad
- Founded: April 25, 2019; 7 years ago (incorporation); October 1, 2019; 6 years ago (effective reorganization)
- Founder: Keita Goto
- Headquarters: Shibuya First Place; 8-16 Shinsenchō, Shibuya-ku, Tokyo, Japan
- Area served: Tokyo and Kanagawa
- Key people: Hirofumi Nomoto (CEO)
- Services: Passenger railways Other related services
- Owner: Tokyu Group
- Parent: Tokyu Corporation
- Website: www.tokyu.co.jp/railway

Tokyu Corporation (東急株式会社, Tōkyū kabushiki-gaisha), a contraction of and formerly Tōkyō Kyūkō Dentetsu kabushiki gaisha (東京急行電鉄株式会社; "Tokyo Express Electric Railway Stock Company") until 2 September 2019, is a Japanese keiretsu or conglomerate headquartered in Shibuya, Tokyo. While a multinational corporation, its main operation is the Tokyu Railways Co., Ltd. (ja:東急電鉄株式会社, Tōkyū Dentetsu kabushiki gaisha), a wholly owned subsidiary operating railways in the Greater Tokyo Area.

== History ==
Logo of the Meguro-Kamata Electric Railway

Logo of the Tokyo-Yokohama Electric Railway

Former Tokyu logo

The oldest predecessor of the company was the Musashi Electric Railway (武蔵電気鉄道, Musashi Denki Tetsudō), opened in 1908. The railway's operations were converted into a kabushiki gaisha (company) in 1910. Keita Gotō, a notable Japanese industrialist, was appointed as the CEO in 1920 and he began a major expansion program.

The most important predecessor was first registered on September 2, 1922, as the Meguro-Kamata Electric Railway (目黒蒲田電鉄, Meguro-Kamata Dentetsu). That company was originally founded by the developers of Den-en-chōfu, a residential neighborhood in Tokyo. Meguro-Kamata Electric Railway was acquired by the Musashi Electric Railway in 1924, shortly before Musashi was renamed into the Tokyo-Yokohama Electric Railway (東京横浜電鉄, Tōkyō-Yokohama Dentetsu), also known as the Toyoko, in the same year.

After Musashi/Toyoko's acquisition, the Meguro-Kamata Electric Railway initially operated as a subsidiary of Toyoko. It was not until 16 October 1939 that both Toyoko and Meguro-Kamata Electric railways were formally merged and the new company took the Toyoko name.

In 1938, Toyoko established Toyoko Eiga [ja], possibly to compete with Ichizo Kobayashi's Toho Company. It became the Toei Company in 1951.

Toyoko took its current name on 1 May 1942, after the Japanese government compelled the company to acquire the Odawara Express Railway and the Keihin Electric Railway in 1943 to support Japan's efforts in the Pacific War of World War II. In 1944 it also acquired the Keio Teito Electric Railway (which had merged with Odawara Express before in 1940).

In 1948, after the war, Tokyu divested the acquired companies, and the divested companies are now known as Odakyu Electric Railway, Keikyu Corporation, and Keio Corporation respectively. The 1943–48 era of Tokyu was colloquially known as Dai-Tokyu (lit. Great Tokyu).

== Tokyu lines ==
Tokyu route map

Line	Symbol	Route	Length (km)	Stations	Year opened	Max speed (km/h)
Tōyoko	Tōyoko Line	Shibuya – Yokohama	24.2	21	1926	110
Meguro	Meguro Line	Meguro – Hiyoshi	11.9	13	1923	110
Den-en-toshi	Den-en-toshi Line	Shibuya – Chūō-rinkan	31.5	27	1907	110
Ōimachi	Ōimachi Line	Ōimachi – Mizonokuchi	10.4	16	1927	85
Ikegami	Ikegami Line	Gotanda – Kamata	10.9	15	1922	80
Setagaya	Setagaya Line	Sangen-Jaya – Shimo-Takaido	5.0	10	1925	40
Tamagawa	Tōkyū Tamagawa Line	Kamata – Tamagawa	5.6	7	2000	80
Shin-yokohama	Tōkyū Shin-Yokohama Line	Shin-yokohama – Hiyoshi	5.8	3	2023	100
Total (8 lines)			105.3	96		

Tokyu also operates the Kodomonokuni Line and Minatomirai Line under contract with and on behalf of Yokohama Minatomirai Railway Company.

Topological route map

== Related businesses ==
The Tokyu Group also owns two smaller railroad companies, Ueda Kōtsū and Izukyū Corporation; several bus companies; and a major upscale department store chain, the Tokyu Department Store operating in Japan and the MBK Center in Bangkok, Thailand. It also runs a number of hotels under the names Tokyu/Pan Pacific in Japan and formerly owned the Pan Pacific Hotels abroad, which it sold to UOL Limited of Singapore.

Formerly the owner of Japan Air System (JAS), Tokyu used to be the largest shareholder of Japan Airlines Holdings (JAL) following JAS's merger with JAL. The Tokyu Group also owns and operates the upscale Tokyu Hotels and budget Tokyu Inns.

From 1958 until 2001, Tokyu also owned the Japanese (now American) Shirokiya department store company. It was the owner of Mago Island until 2005, when Mel Gibson purchased it for US$15 million.

Tokyu Corporation is also the largest single shareholder in the Shizuoka Railway Company, but its holdings in the railway are not part of the group.

== Rolling stock ==
- Tokyu 9000 series (since 1986)
- Tokyu 1000 series (since 1988)
- Tokyu 2000 series (since 1992)
- Tokyu 300 series (Setagaya Line, since 1999)
- Tokyu 3000 series (since 1999)
- Tokyu 5000 series (since 2002)
- Tokyu 6000 series (since 2007)
- Tokyu 7000 series (since 2007)
- Tokyu 2020 series (since early 2018)
- Tokyu 6020 series (since early 2018)
- Tokyu 3020 series (since mid-2019)

New Tokyu 2020 series ten-car EMUs and Tokyu 6020 series seven-car EMUs have entered service since early 2018.

== Gallery ==
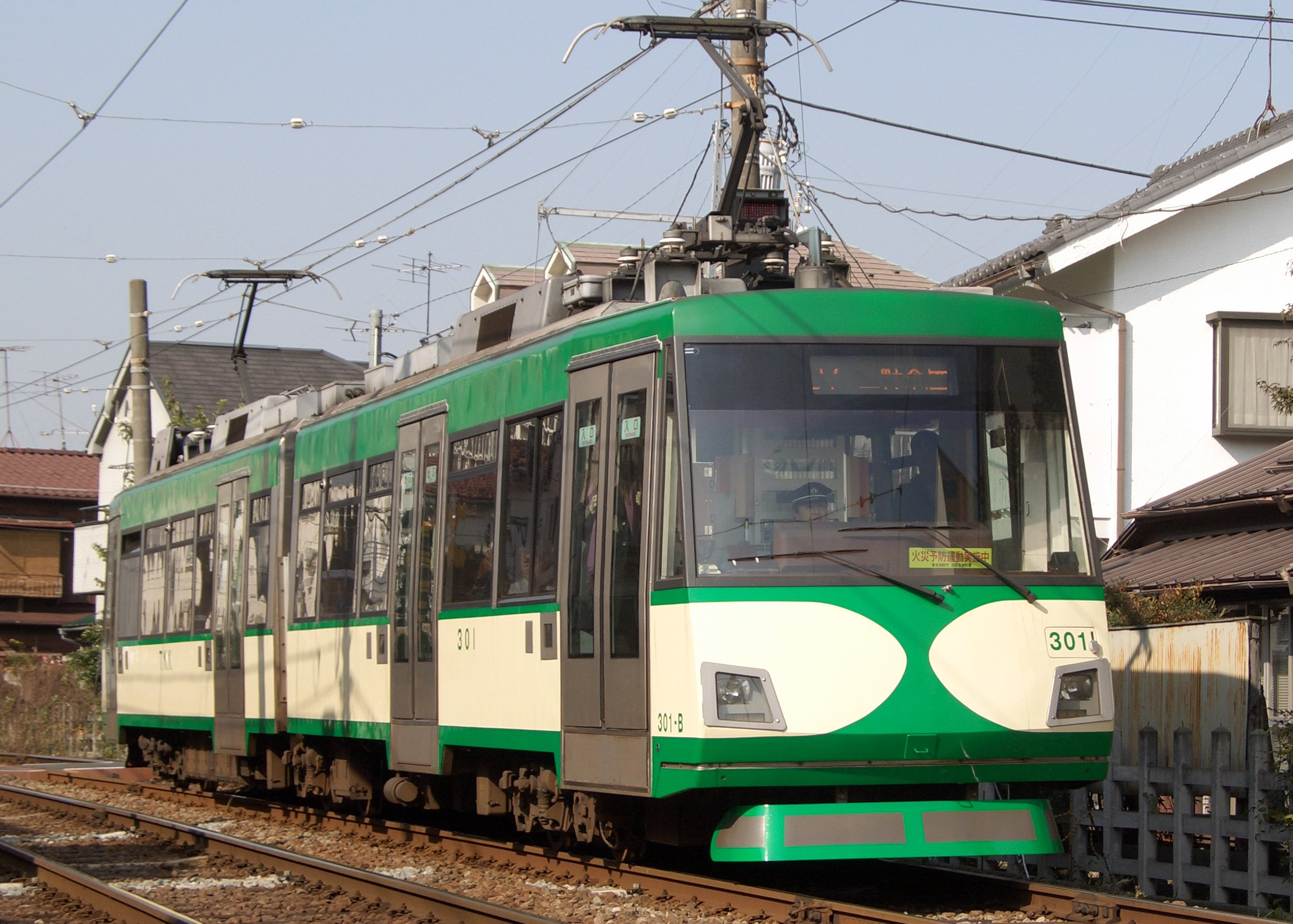
Tokyu 300 series

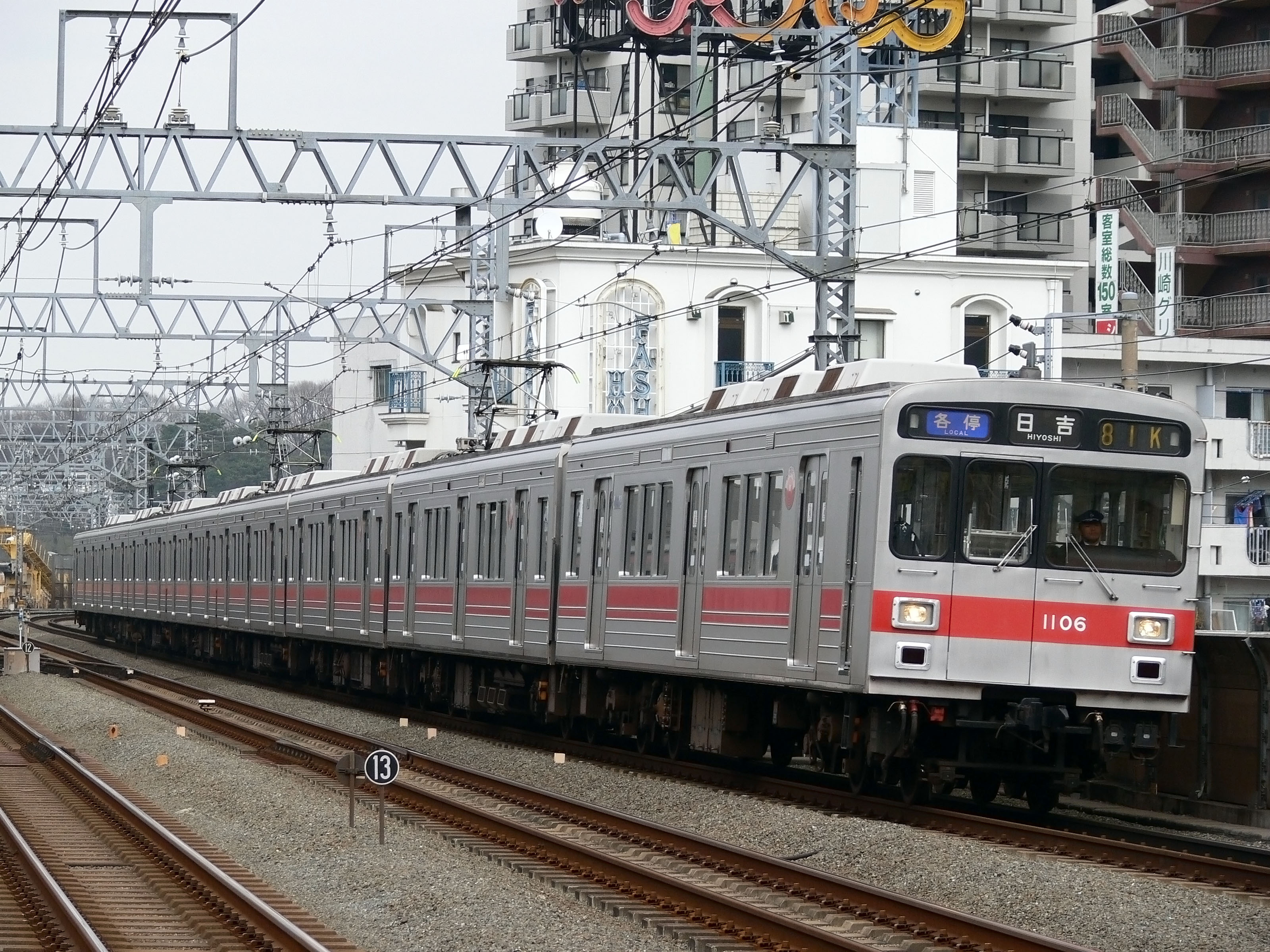
Tokyu 1000 series

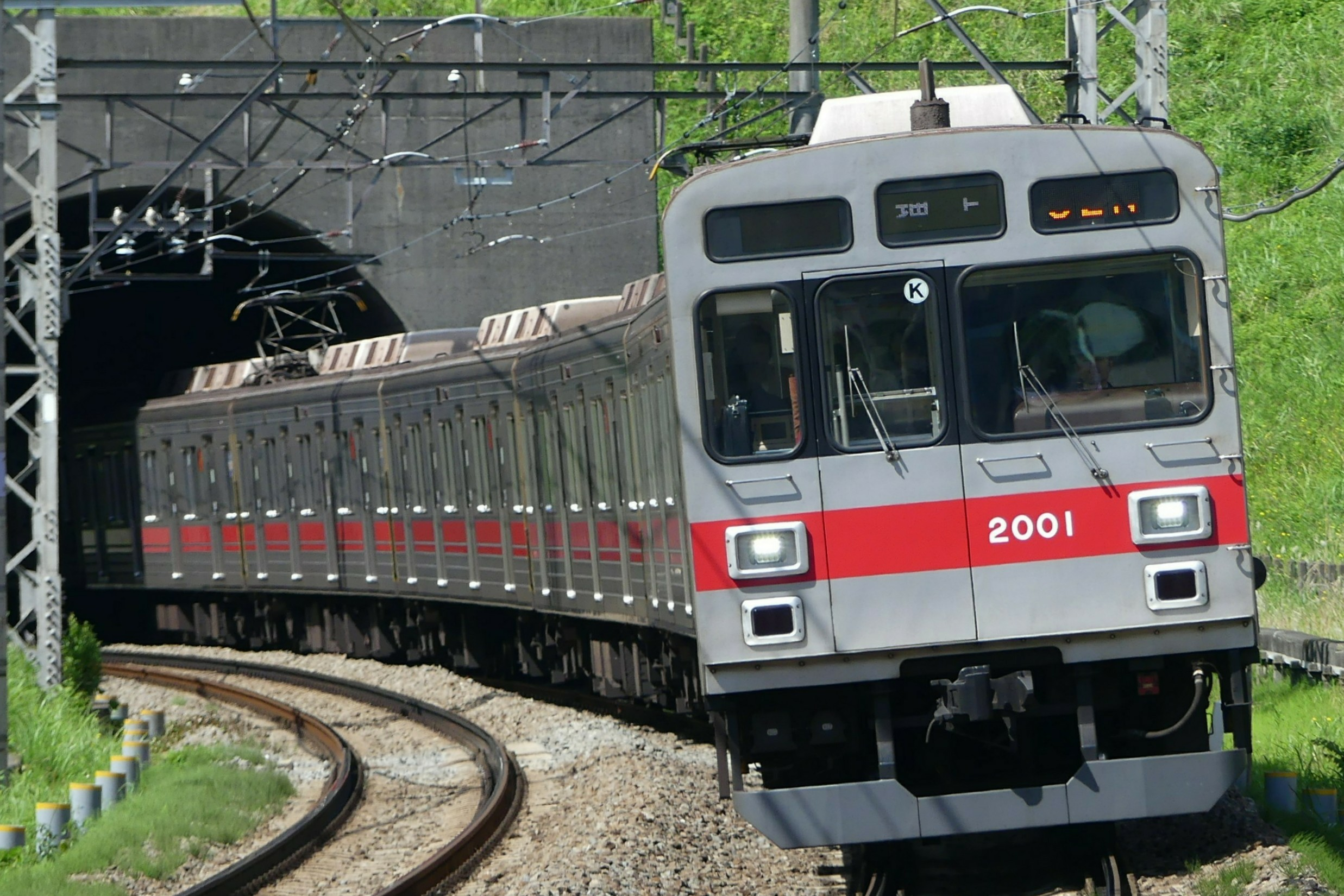
Tokyu 2000 series

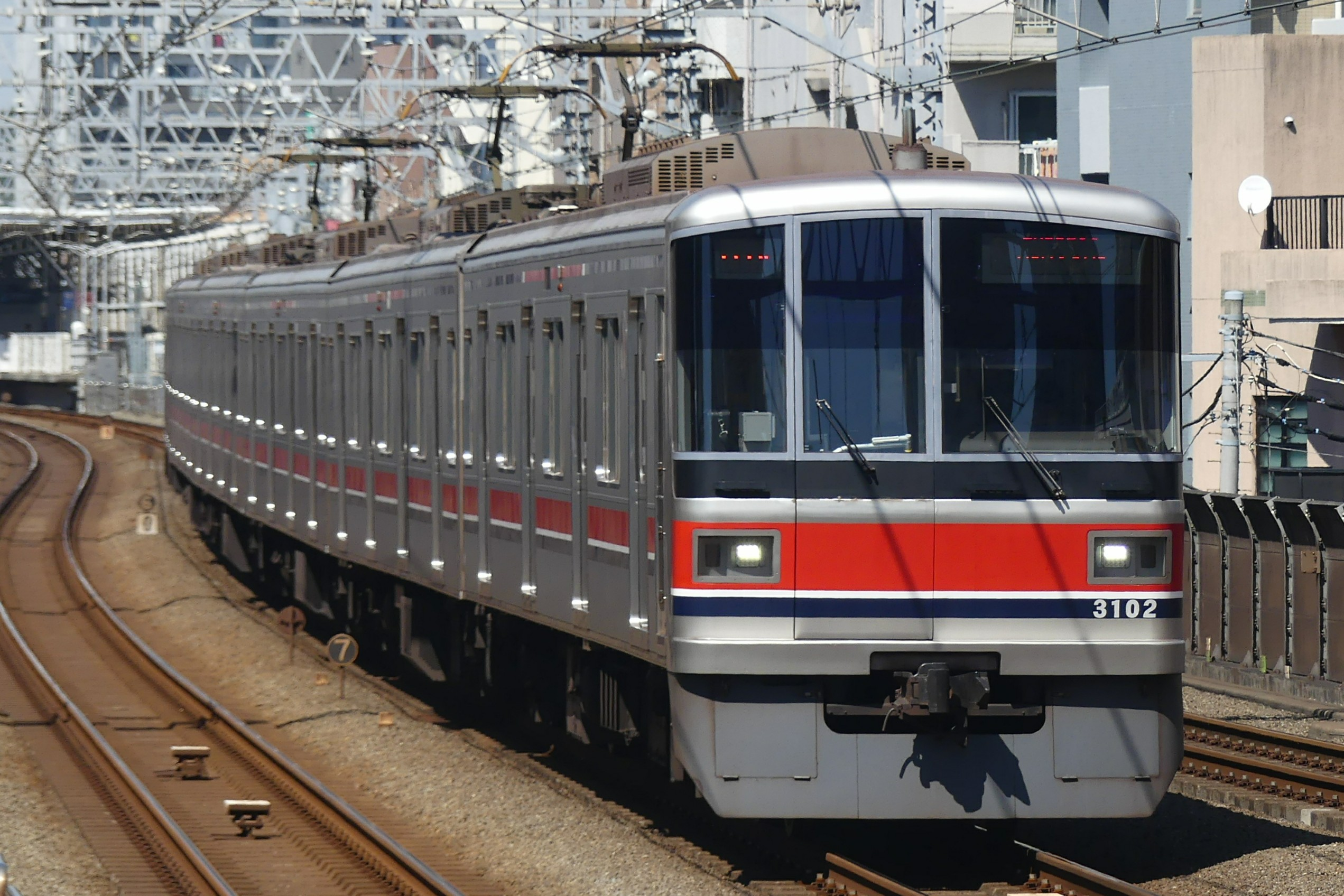
Tokyu 3000 series

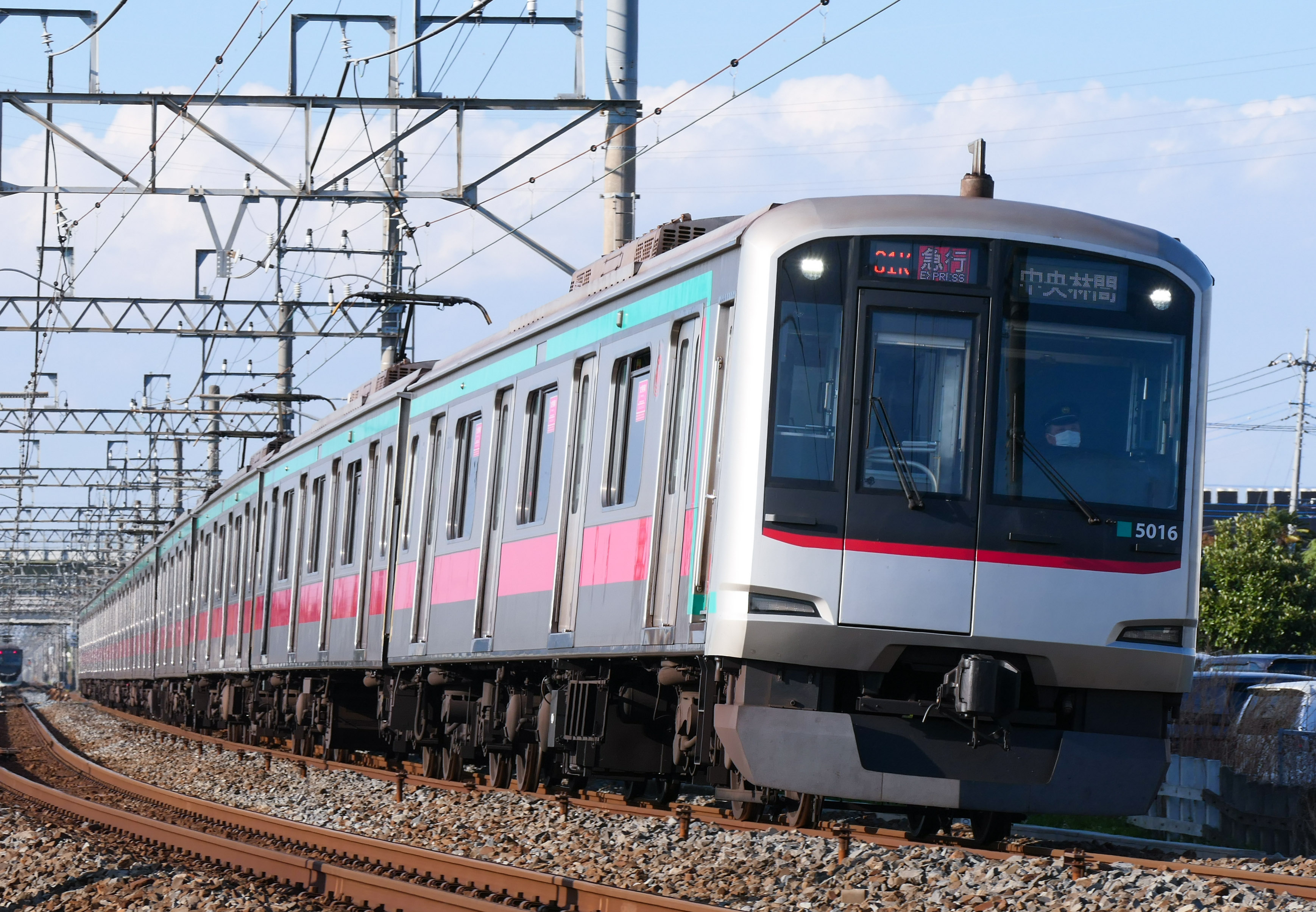
Tokyu 5000 series

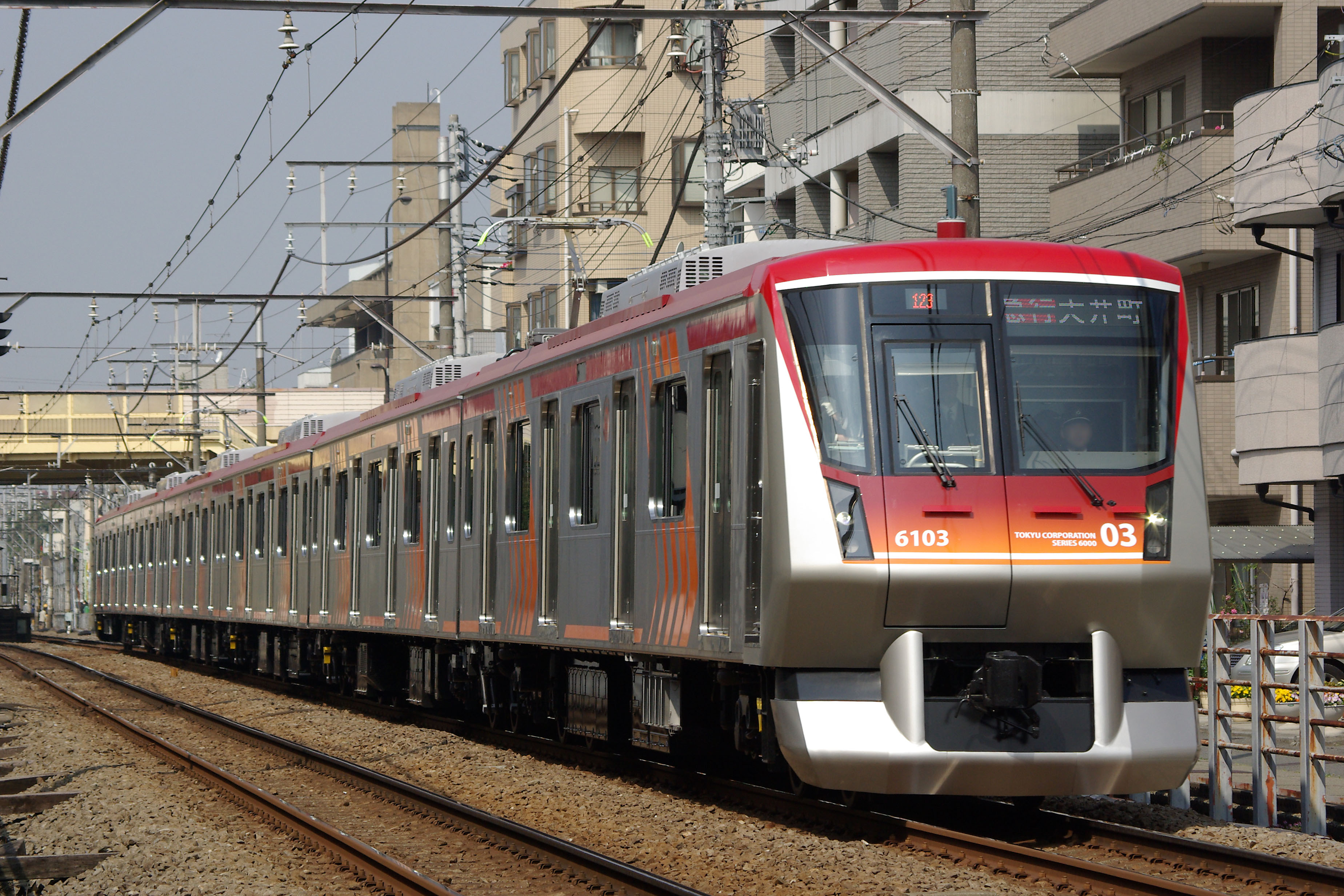
Tokyu 6000 series

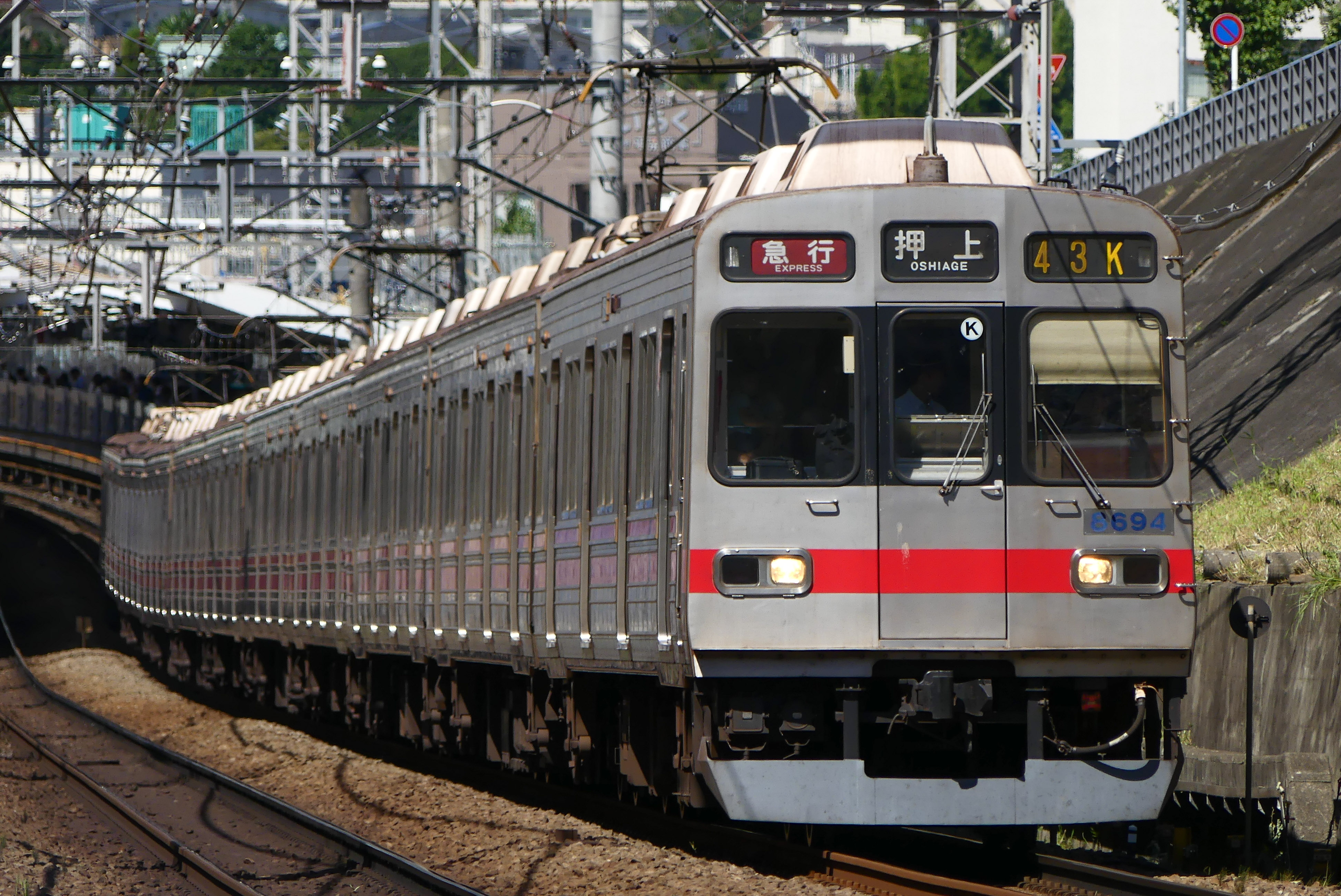
Tokyu 8090 series

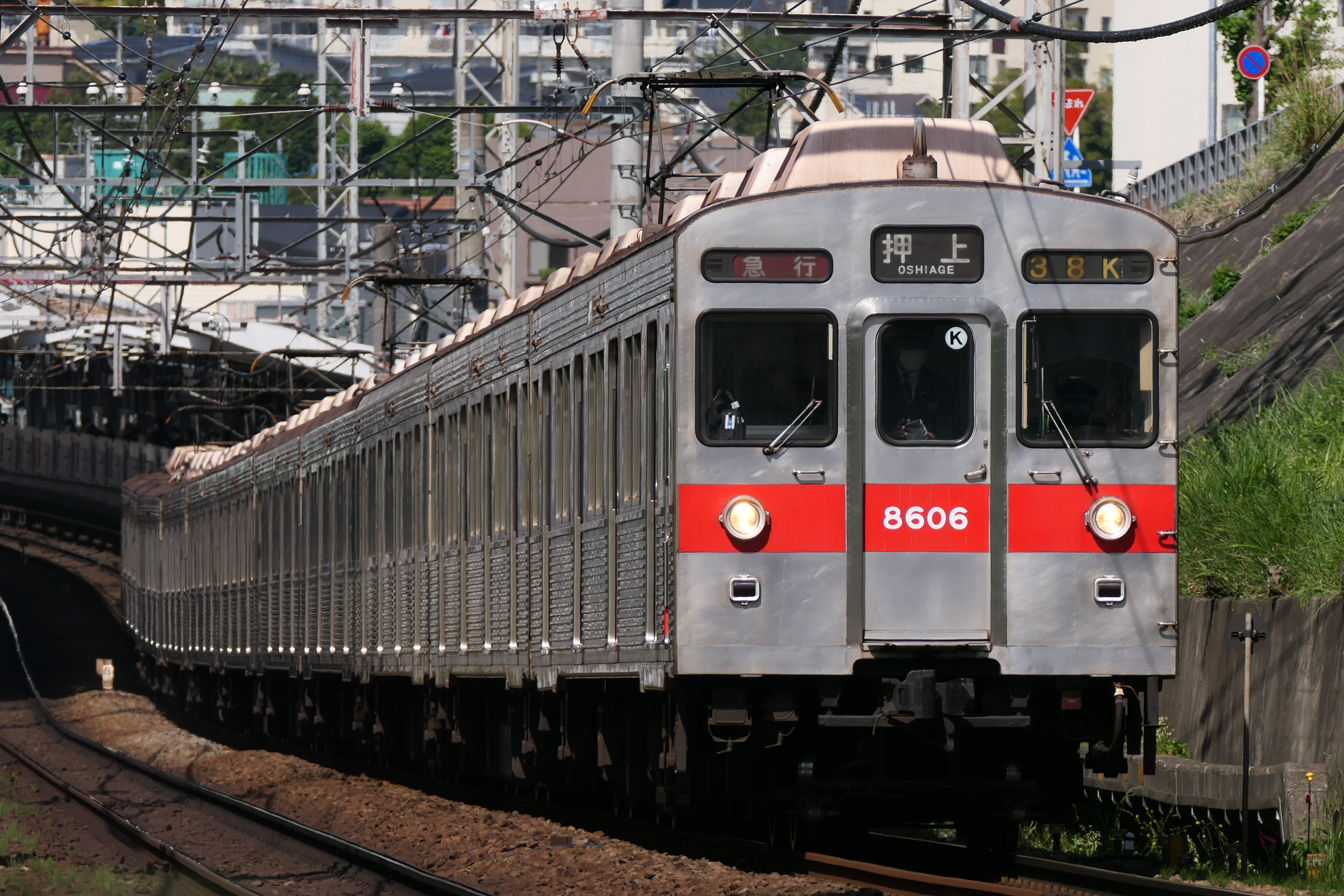
Tokyu 8500 series

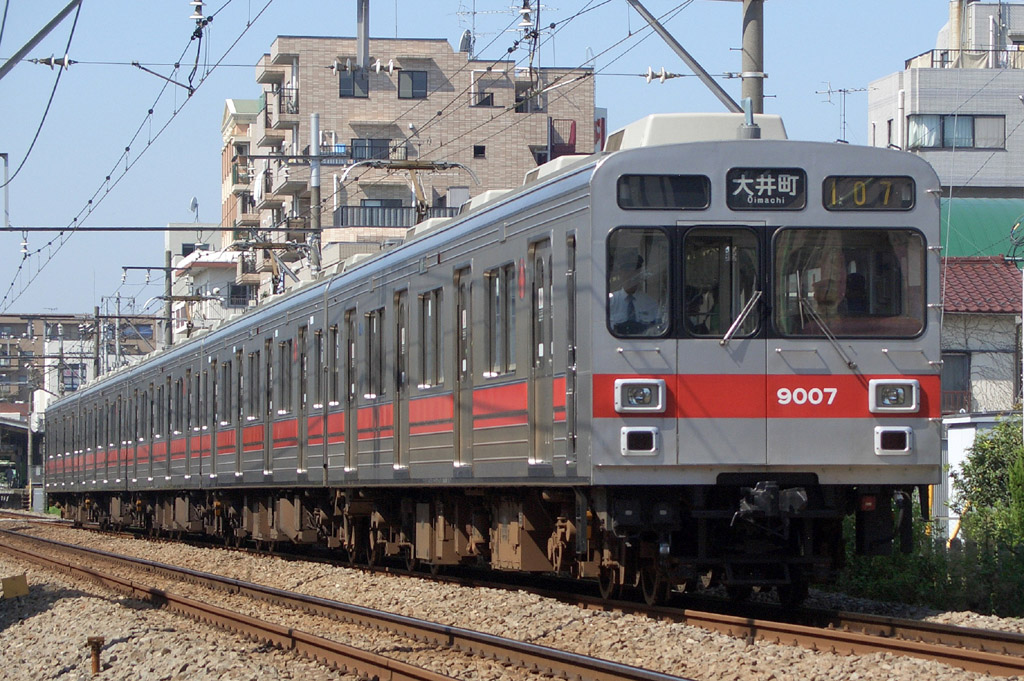
Tokyu 9000 series

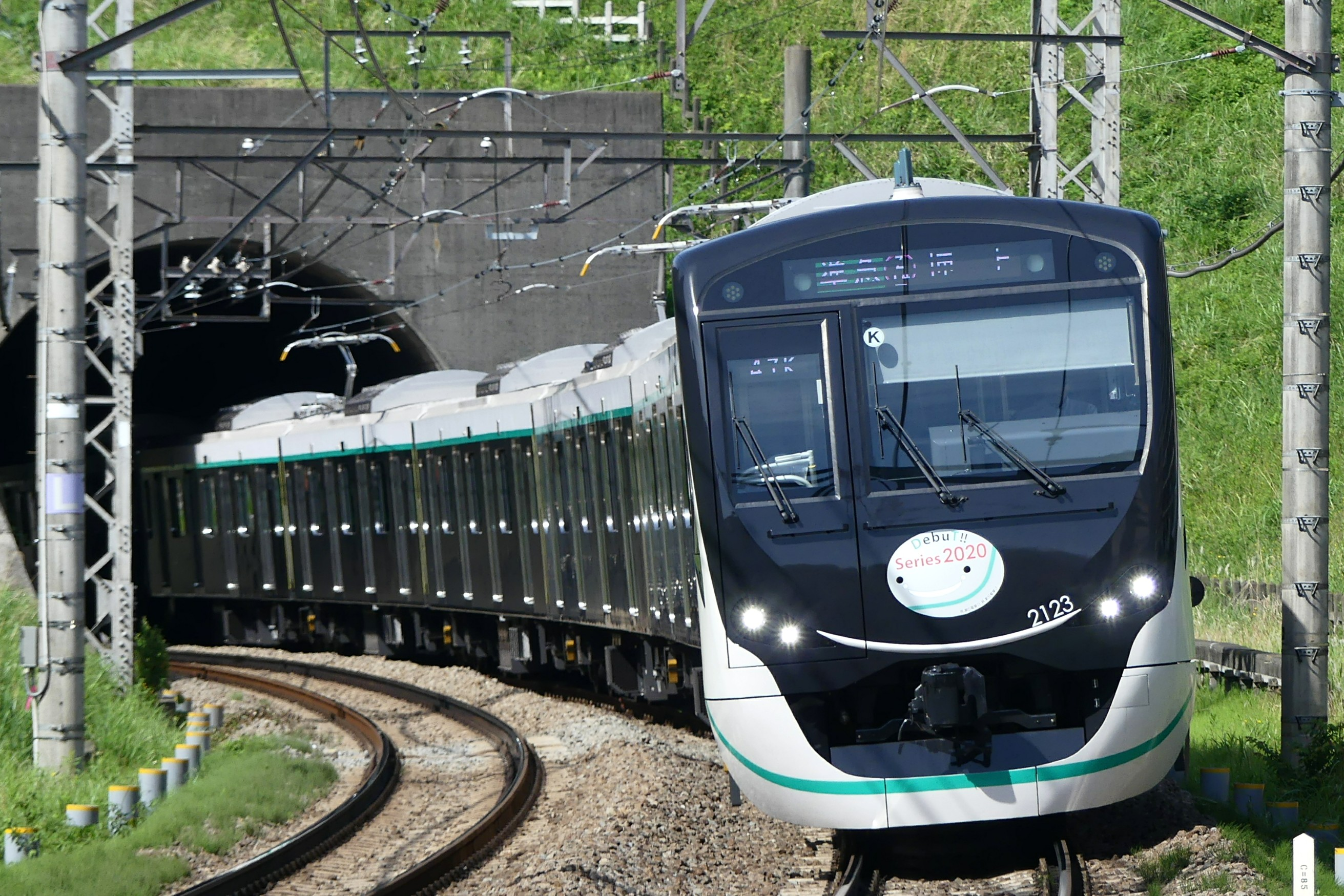
Tokyu 2020 series

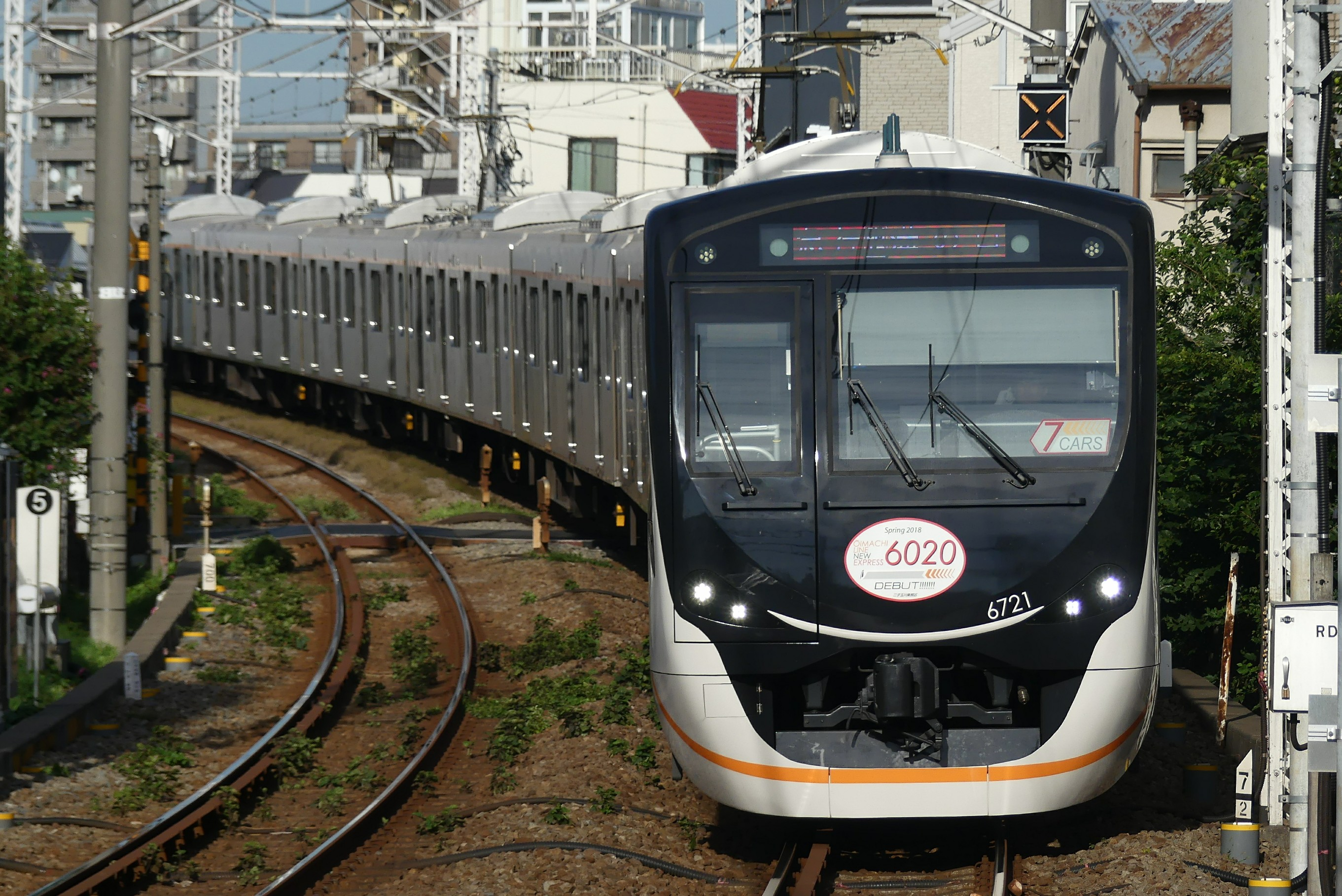
Tokyu 6020 series

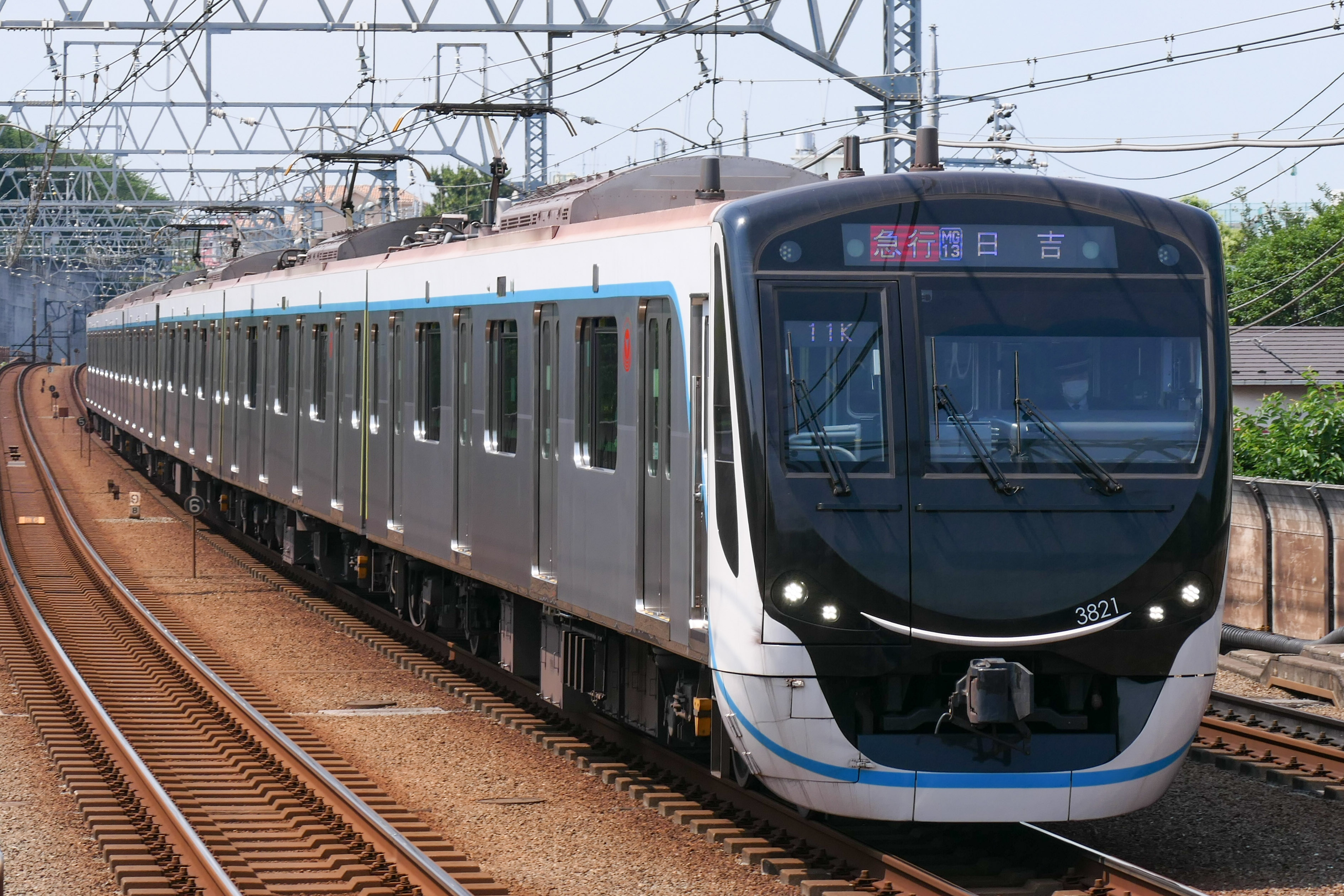
Tokyu 3020 series

== See also ==
- Cerulean Tower
- Keita Gotō (industrialist)
