= Sugino (disambiguation) =

Sugino (written: 杉野) is a Japanese surname. Notable people with the surname include:

== People with the surname ==
- Akiko Sugino (杉野 明子; born 1990), Japanese para-badminton player
- Akio Sugino (杉野 昭夫; born 1944), Japanese character designer
- Kenichi Sugino (杉野 憲一), creator and designer of most of the Game Boy line
- Kento Sugino (杉野 健斗; born 1992), Japanese footballer
- Kiki Sugino (杉野 希妃; born 1984), Japanese actress, writer, producer, film director
- Takaaki Sugino (杉野 正尭; born 1998), Japanese artistic gymnast
- Sugino Yoshiko (杉野 芳子; 1892-1978), Japanese fashion designer and educator
- Yoshio Sugino (杉野 嘉男; 1904–1998), Japanese martial artist and film choreographer
- Yosuke Sugino (杉野 遥亮; born 1995), Japanese actor and model

== Fictional characters ==
- Tomohito Sugino (杉野 友人), a character in the manga series Assassination Classroom

== Other ==
- Sugino, a Japanese bicycle components manufacturing company
- Sugino Fashion College
