= Ebara (disambiguation) =

Ebara Corporation is a Japanese company.

Ebara may also refer to:

- Ebara, Tokyo, a district in Tokyo, Japan

== People with the surname ==
- Masashi Ebara
- Ebara Soroku

== Train stations ==
- Ebara Station, a station in Toyooka, Hyogo
- Ebaramachi Station, a station in Shinagawa, Tokyo
- Ebara-Nakanobu Station, a station in Shinagawa, Tokyo
- Etchū-Ebara Station, a station in Toyama, Toyama
- Sōunnosato-Ebara Station, a station in Ibara, Okayama
