= Takeshi Mori (announcer) =

- 森 武史
- Born: 2 December 1959; Shinagawa, Tokyo, Japan
- Other name: 森 たけし
- Occupations: Television announcer Tarento
- Years active: 1983–present
- Employer: Yomiuri TV→Mori chan
- Website: ameblo.jp/takeshimori2020/

Takeshi Mori (森 武史 or 森 たけし, Mori Takeshi; born 2 December 1959 in Shinagawa, Tokyo, Japan) is a Japanese television announcer and works for Yomiuri Telecasting Corporation. After leaving Yomiuri TV, he will run a personal company "Mori chan".

He entered Yomiuri TV as a television announcer in 1983, and won the 1987 Silver Award from the Shingo-Ryūkōgo Taishō (lit. "Neologism-Buzzword Prize") with Jiro Shinbo for creating the buzzword neologism Nangiyanā (なんぎやなぁ) in response to the losing streak of the Hanshin Tigers during that time period.
