= Ōsakihirokōji Station =

Railway station in Tokyo, Japan

Coordinates: 35°37′21″N 139°43′21″E

Ōsakihirokōji Station 大崎広小路駅

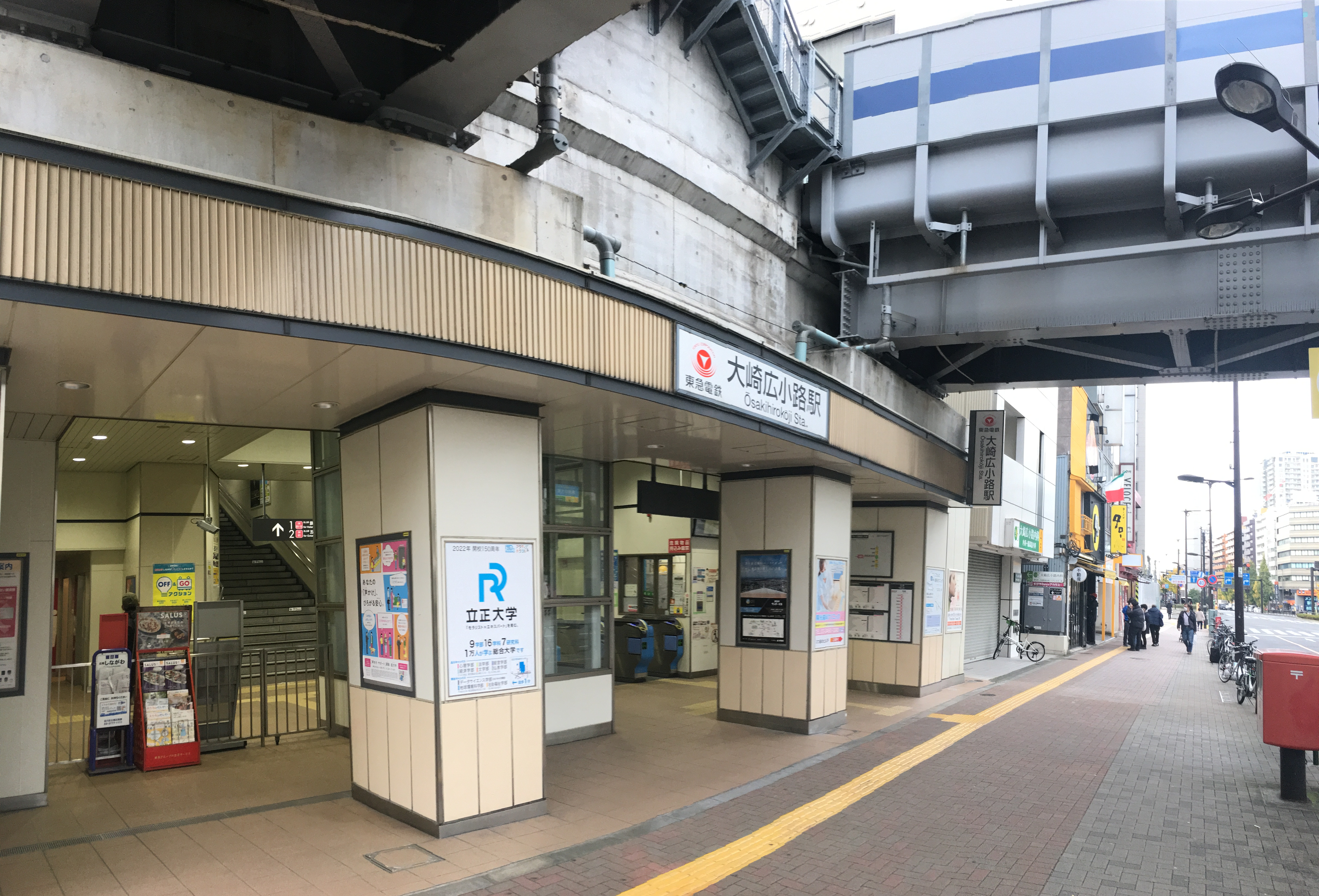
- Station entrance, 2022

General information
- Location: 4-chome, Ōsaki, Shinagawa, Tokyo （東京都品川区大崎４丁目） Japan
- Operator: Tōkyū Railways
- Line: Ikegami Line
- Platforms: 1 island platform
- Tracks: 2
- Connections: Bus stop

Construction
- Structure type: Elevated

Other information
- Station code: IK02

History
- Opened: 9 October 1927; 98 years ago

Services
Preceding station	Tōkyū Railways	Following station
Togoshi-ginza towards Kamata	Ikegami Line	Gotanda Terminus
Location
- Location within Special wards of Tokyo Location within Tokyo Bay and Bōsō Peninsula Location within Tokyo Location within Japan

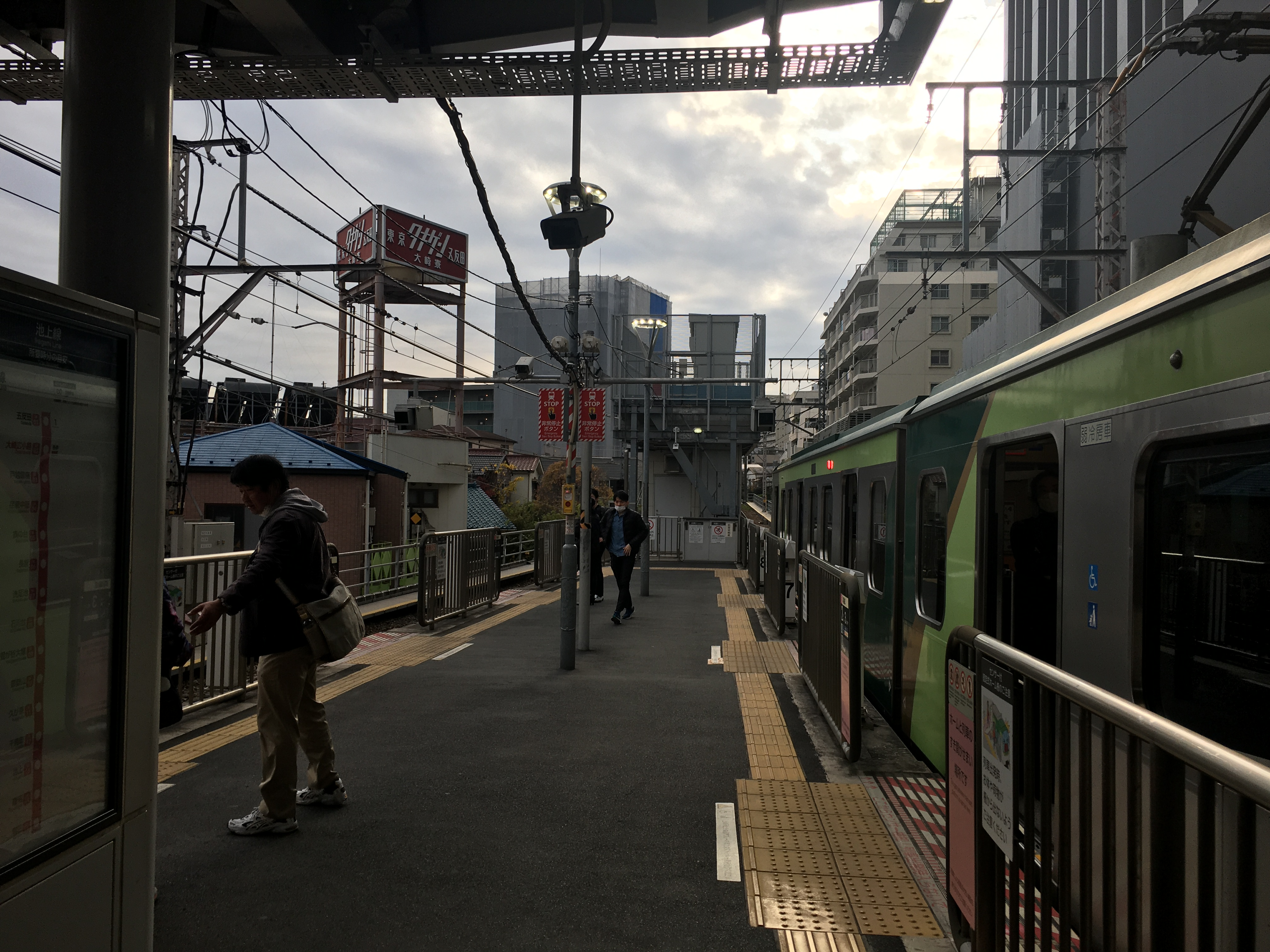
Station platforms, 2022

Ōsakihirokōji Station (大崎広小路駅, -eki) is a station on the Tōkyū Ikegami Line in southeast Tokyo, Japan. The line originally terminated at this station, but was later extended to nearby Gotanda Station, a mere 300 metres (330 yd) away. It is also within walking distance from Osaki Station.

== Station layout ==
An elevated island platform.

1	■ Ikegami Line	Togoshi-Ginza ・ Hatanodai ・ Yukigaya-Ōtsuka ・ Ikegami ・ Kamata
2	■ Ikegami Line	Gotanda

== History ==
- October 9, 1927 Opened (Togoshi-Ginza - Ōsakihirokōji opened).
- June 17, 1928 Ōsakihirokōji - Gotanda opened.

Osakihirokoji Station features in Ozu Yasujiro's 1957 film Tokyo Twilight (Tokyo Boshoku).

== Bus services ==
- Ōsakihirokōji (大崎広小路) bus stop
  - Tokyu Bus
    - <渋41>Shibuya Sta. - Naka-Meguro Sta. - Ōtori Shrine mae - Ōsakihirokōji - Ōsaki Sta. - Ōimachi Sta.
    - <渋72>Shibuya Sta. (East Exit) - Ebisu Sta. - Ōtori Shrine mae - Meguro Fudo - Ōsakihirokōji - Gotanda Sta.
    - <反01>Gotanda Sta. - Ōsakihirokōji - Ebara Garage - Ikegami Police Station - Tamagawa Ōhashi - Kawasaki Sta.
    - <反02>Gotanda Sta. - Ōsakihirokōji - Ebara Garage - Ikegami Police Station
    - <反11>Gotanda Sta. - Ōsakihirokōji - Gakugeidaigaku Sta. - Setagaya Ward Citizen Hall
