= Shinagawa =

Special ward in Tokyo, Japan

Shinagawa 品川区
- Special ward
- Shinagawa City
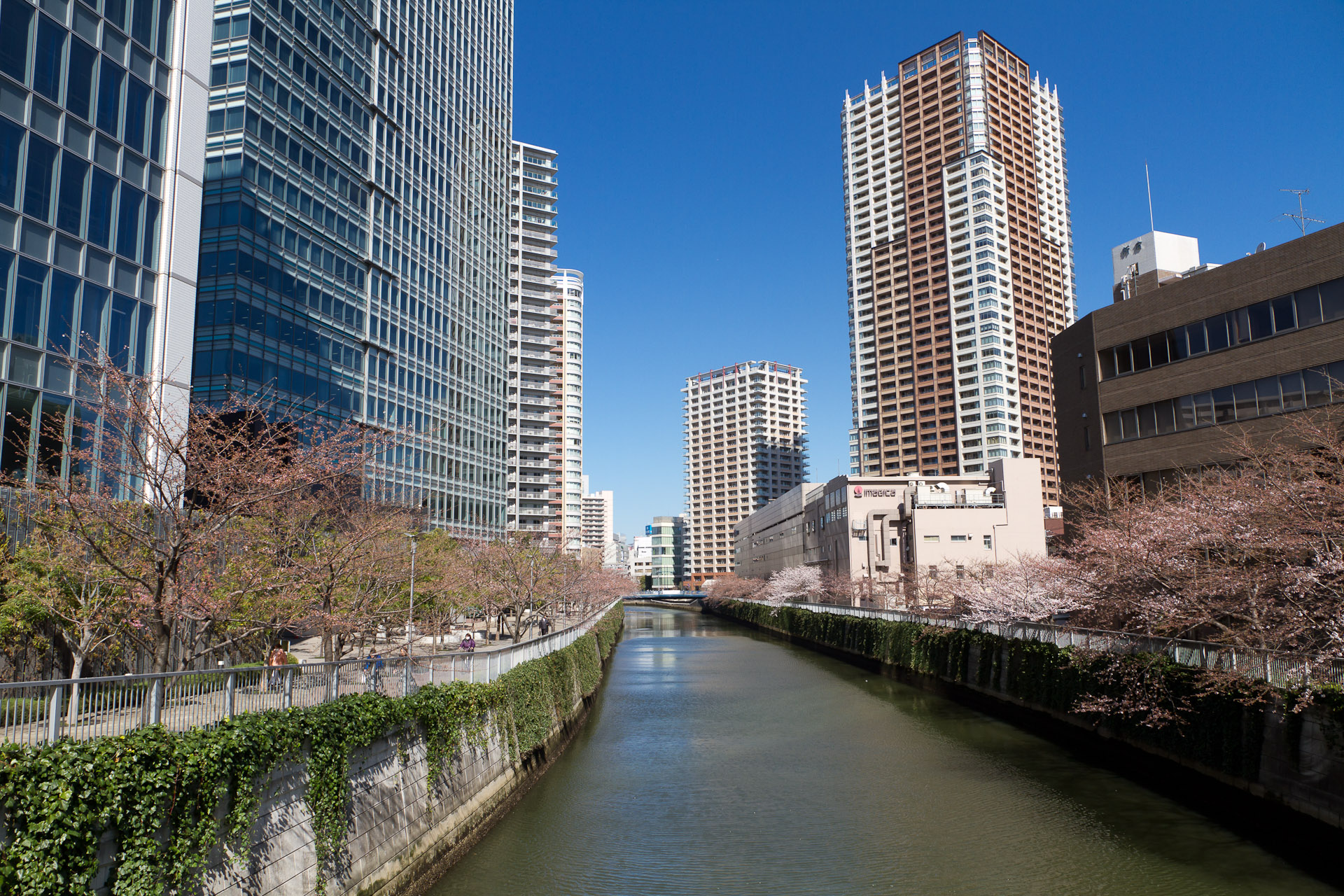
- Meguro River at Ōsaki, Shinagawa

- Flag Seal

- Location of Shinagawa in Tokyo Metropolis

- Location in Japan
- Coordinates: 35°36′N 139°44′E
- Country: Japan
- Region: Kantō
- Prefecture: Tokyo Metropolis

Area
  - Total: 22.84 km^{2} (8.82 sq mi)

Population (October 1, 2020)
  - Total: 422,488
  - Density: 18,497/km^{2} (47,910/sq mi)
- Time zone: UTC+09:00 (JST)
- City hall address: 2-1-36 Hiromachi, Shinagawa-ku, Tōkyō-to; 140-8715
- Website: www.city.shinagawa.tokyo.jp
- Symbols
- Bird: Chroicocephalus ridibundus
- Flower: Rhododendron indicum
- Tree: Castanopsis; Acer

Shinagawa (品川区, Shinagawa-ku; Japanese pronunciation: [ɕì.nä́.ɡä́.β̞ä́(.kɯ̈̀), -ŋä́-]) is a special ward in the Tokyo Metropolis in Japan. The ward refers to itself as Shinagawa City in English. It is home to eleven embassies.

As of 1 April 2016, Shinagawa had an estimated population of 380,293 and a population density of 16,510 persons per km^{2}. The total area is 22.84 km^{2}.

Shinagawa is also commonly used to refer to the business district around Shinagawa Station, which is not in Shinagawa Ward. This Shinagawa is in the Takanawa and Konan neighborhoods of Minato Ward, directly north of Kita-Shinagawa.

== Geography ==
Shinagawa Ward includes natural uplands and lowlands, as well as reclaimed land. The uplands are the eastern end of the Musashino Terrace. They include Shiba-Shirokanedai north of the Meguro River, Megurodai between the Meguro and Tachiai Rivers, and Ebaradai south of the Tachiai River.

The Ward lies on Tokyo Bay. Its neighbors on land are all special wards of Tokyo: Kōtō to the east, Minato to the north, Meguro to the west, and Ōta to the south.

=== Districts and neighborhoods ===
Shinagawa Ward consists of five areas, each consisting of multiple districts and neighborhoods:

- Shinagawa District, including the former Shinagawa-juku on the Tōkaidō.
- Ōsaki (大崎) District, formerly a town of that name, stretching from Ōsaki Station to Gotanda and Meguro Stations.
- Ebara (荏原) District, formerly a town of that name.
- Ōi (大井) District, formerly a town of that name.
- Yashio (八潮) District, consisting of reclaimed land, including Higashiyashio on Odaiba.

Shinagawa Area

- Higashishinagawa
- Hiromachi
- Kitashinagawa
- Minamishinagawa
- Nishishinagawa

Ōi Area

- Ōi
- Higashiōi
- Katsushima
- Minamiōi
- Nishiōi

Ōsaki Area

- Ōsaki
- Higashigotanda
- Kamiōsaki
- Nishigotanda

Ebara Area

- Ebara
- Futaba
- Hatanodai
- Higashinakanobu
- Hiratsuka
- Koyama
- Koyamadai
- Nakanobu
- Nishinakanobu
- Togoshi
- Yutakachō

Yashio Area

- Yashio
- Higashiyashio

== Demographics ==
Historical population
Year	Pop.	±%
1920	121,077	—
1930	311,604	+157.4%
1940	419,403	+34.6%
1945	143,490	−65.8%
1950	268,304	+87.0%
1960	427,859	+59.5%
1970	397,302	−7.1%
1980	345,733	−13.0%
1990	344,611	−0.3%
2000	324,608	−5.8%
2010	365,302	+12.5%
2020	422,488	+15.7%
Source: Censuses (Note: For years prior to 1950, figures cover the area of present-day Shinagawa-ku.)

== History ==
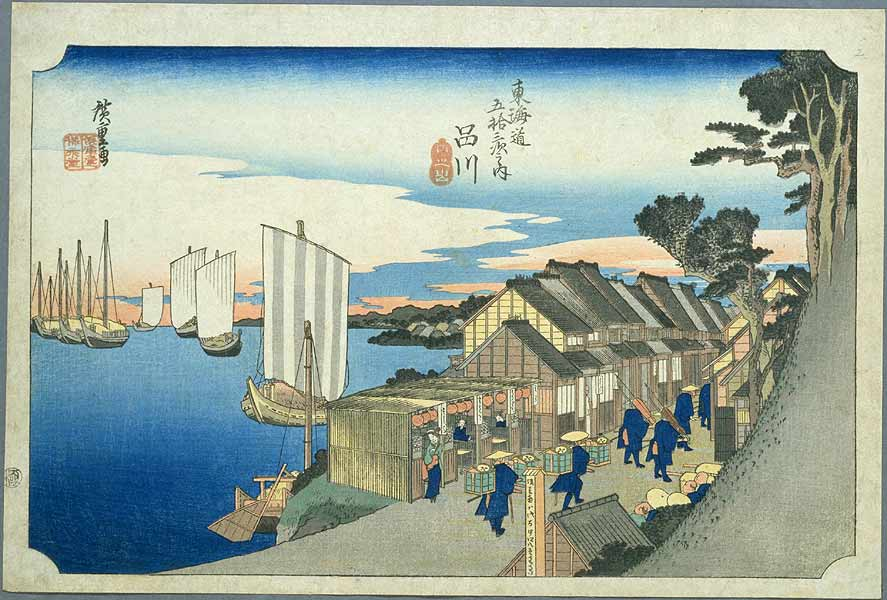
Shinagawa-juku in the 1830s, as depicted by Hiroshige

Most of Tokyo east of the Imperial Palace is on reclaimed land. A large proportion of the reclamation took place during the Edo period, when Shinagawa-juku was the first shukuba (post town) in the "53 Stations of the Tōkaidō" that a traveler would reach after setting out from Nihonbashi to Kyoto on the Tōkaidō. The Tokugawa shogunate maintained the Suzugamori execution grounds in Shinagawa.

Following the Meiji Restoration and the abolition of the han system, Shinagawa Prefecture was instituted in 1869. The prefectural administration was to be set up in the Ebara District, but in 1871 Shinagawa Prefecture was integrated into Tokyo Prefecture. In 1932, during the reorganisation of the municipal boundaries of Tokyo City following the 1923 Great Kantō earthquake, a smaller version of Shinagawa Ward was created. On March 15, 1947, this was merged with the neighboring Ebara Ward to create the present Shinagawa Ward.

The Ward's historic post-town function is retained today with several large hotels near the train station offering 6,000 rooms, the largest concentration in Tokyo.

The Tōkaidō Shinkansen high-speed rail line began serving Shinagawa Station in 2003.

== Economy ==
=== Corporate headquarters ===
- 3M Japan
- Adobe KK
- Dassault Systèmes K.K.
- Fuji Electric
- Gakken Holdings
- General Motors Japan
- Hitachi Solutions
- Hitachi Systems
- Japan Airlines
- Japan Steel Works
- Kobe Steel Tokyo Head Office
- Kodak Japan
- Lawson
- Marvelous
- Meidensha
- Mitsubishi Pencil
- Mitsui Kinzoku
- Nikon
- Nippon Sanso Holdings
- NSK
- Puma Japan
- Sanrio
- Sega
- Siemens K.K.
- Starbucks Coffee Japan
- Sumitomo Bakelite
- Sumitomo Heavy Industries
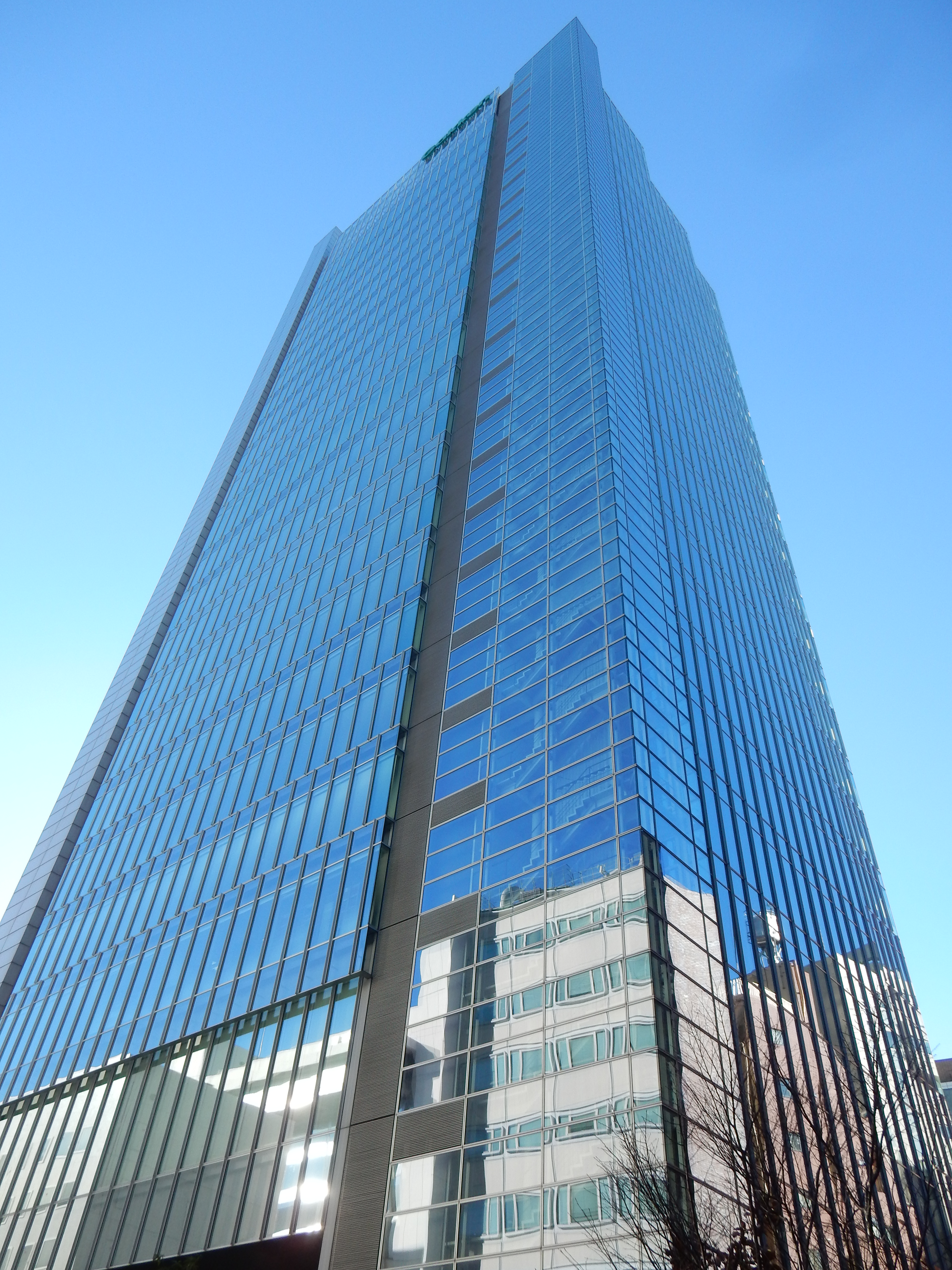
Gakken

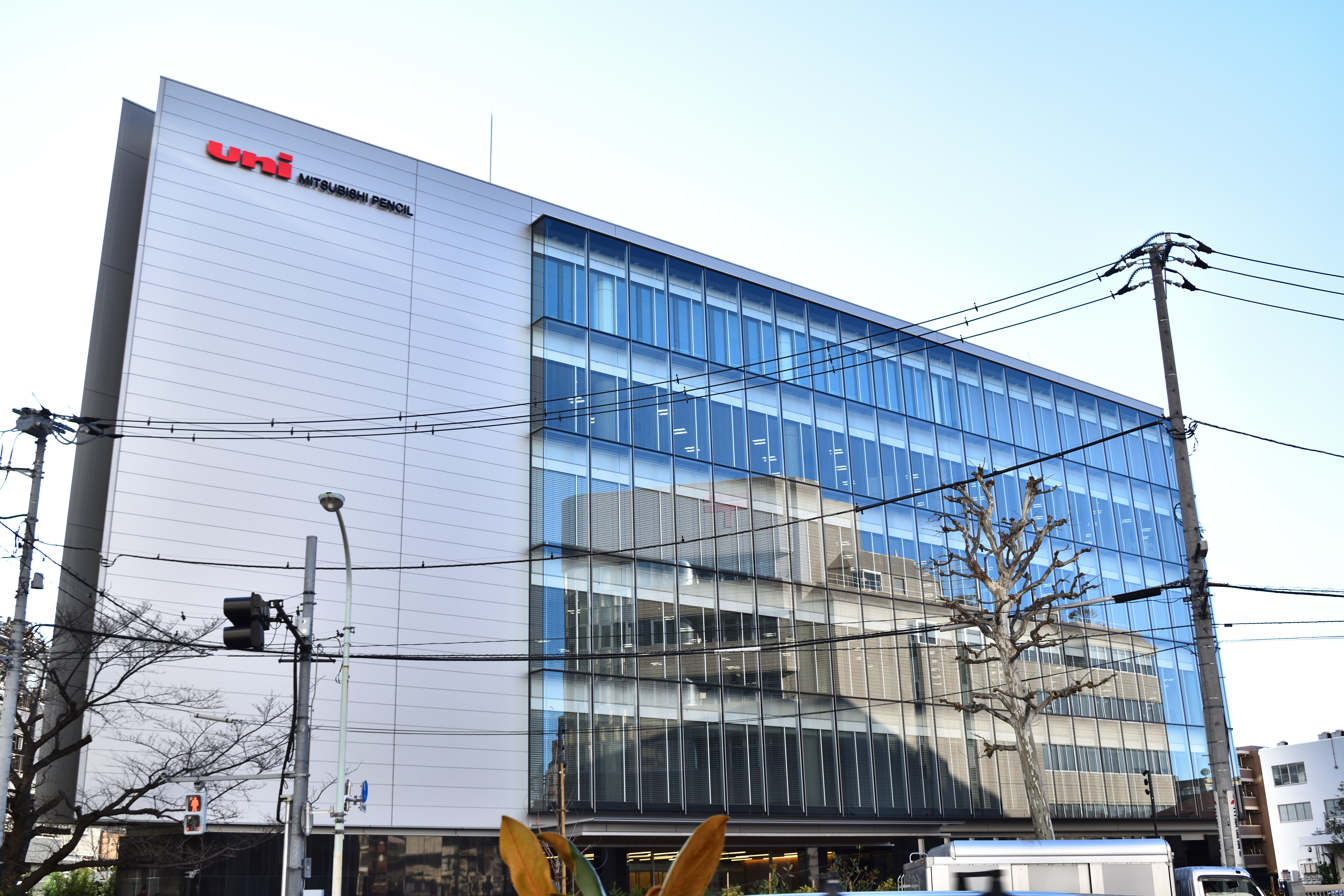
Mitsubishi Pencil

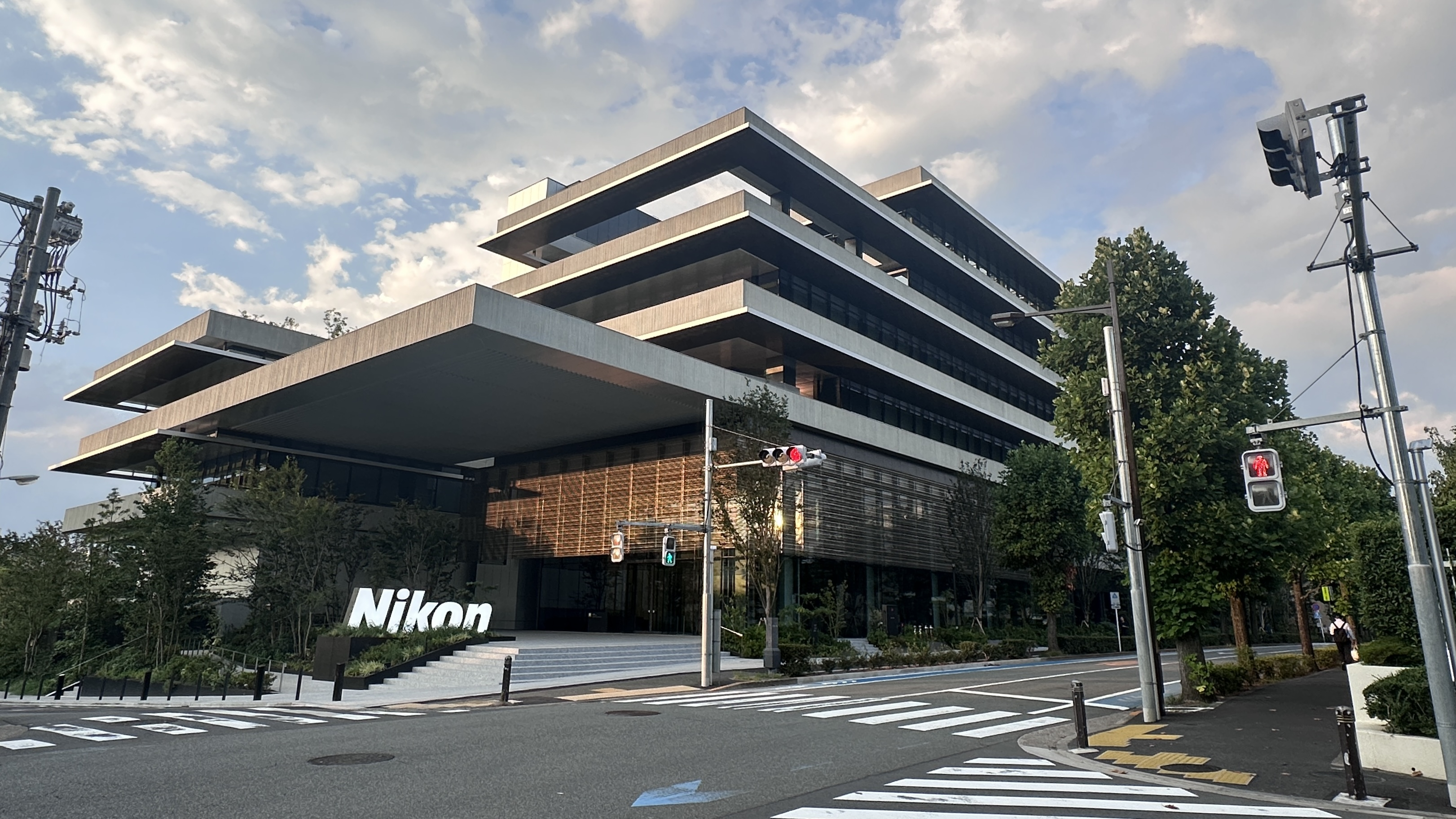
Nikon

=== Former economic operations ===
Sony had its headquarters and related facilities in Kitashinagawa from 1947, the next year of its founding, until 2007. They were relocated to Minato, Tokyo, and the site was redeveloped into an upscale residential area and office buildings.

Nikon developed and manufactured products at factories in Nishiōi, Shinagawa from 1918 to 2016. In 2024, the company built its headquarters building on the site of those former factories.

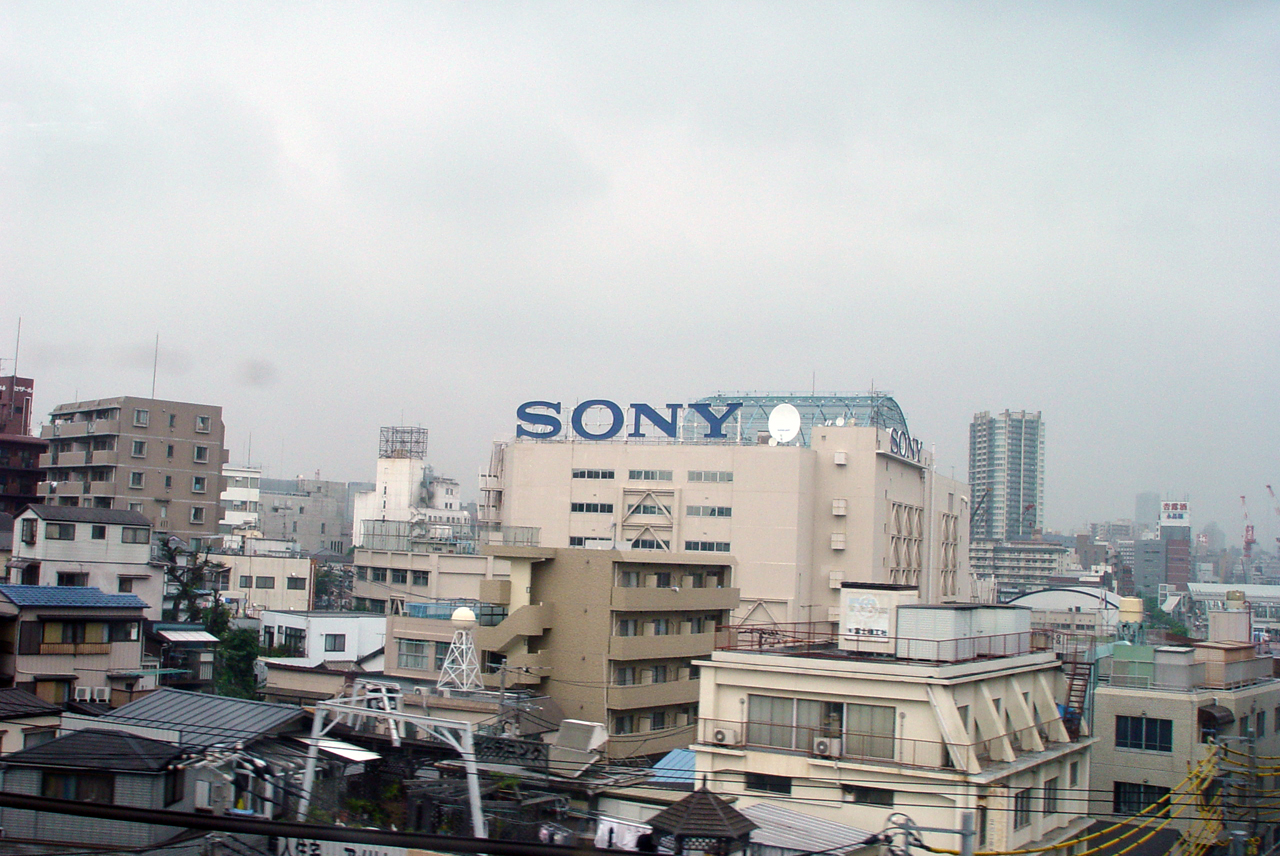
Former Sony headquarters in 2005

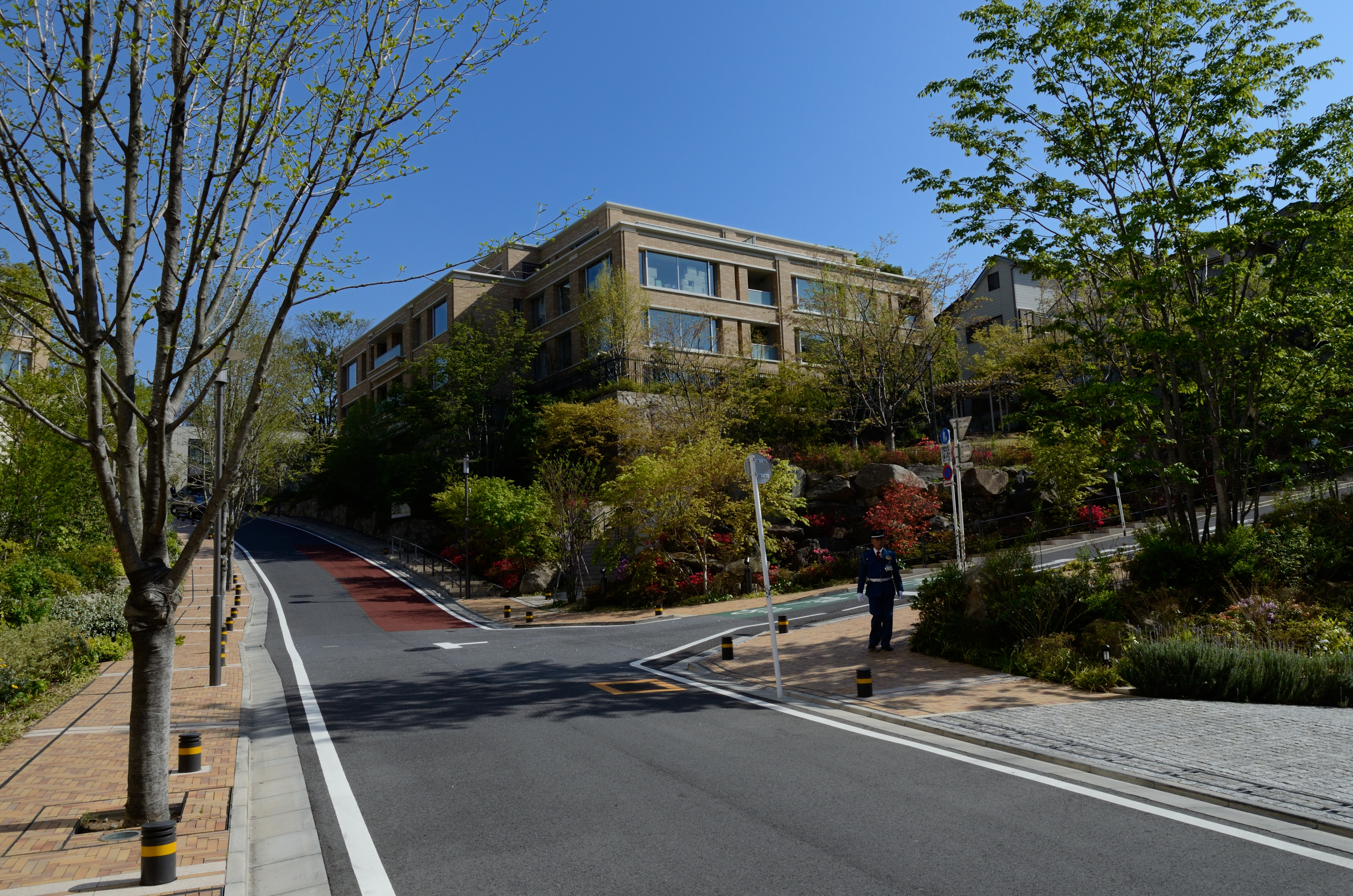
Site of Sony headquarters in 2013

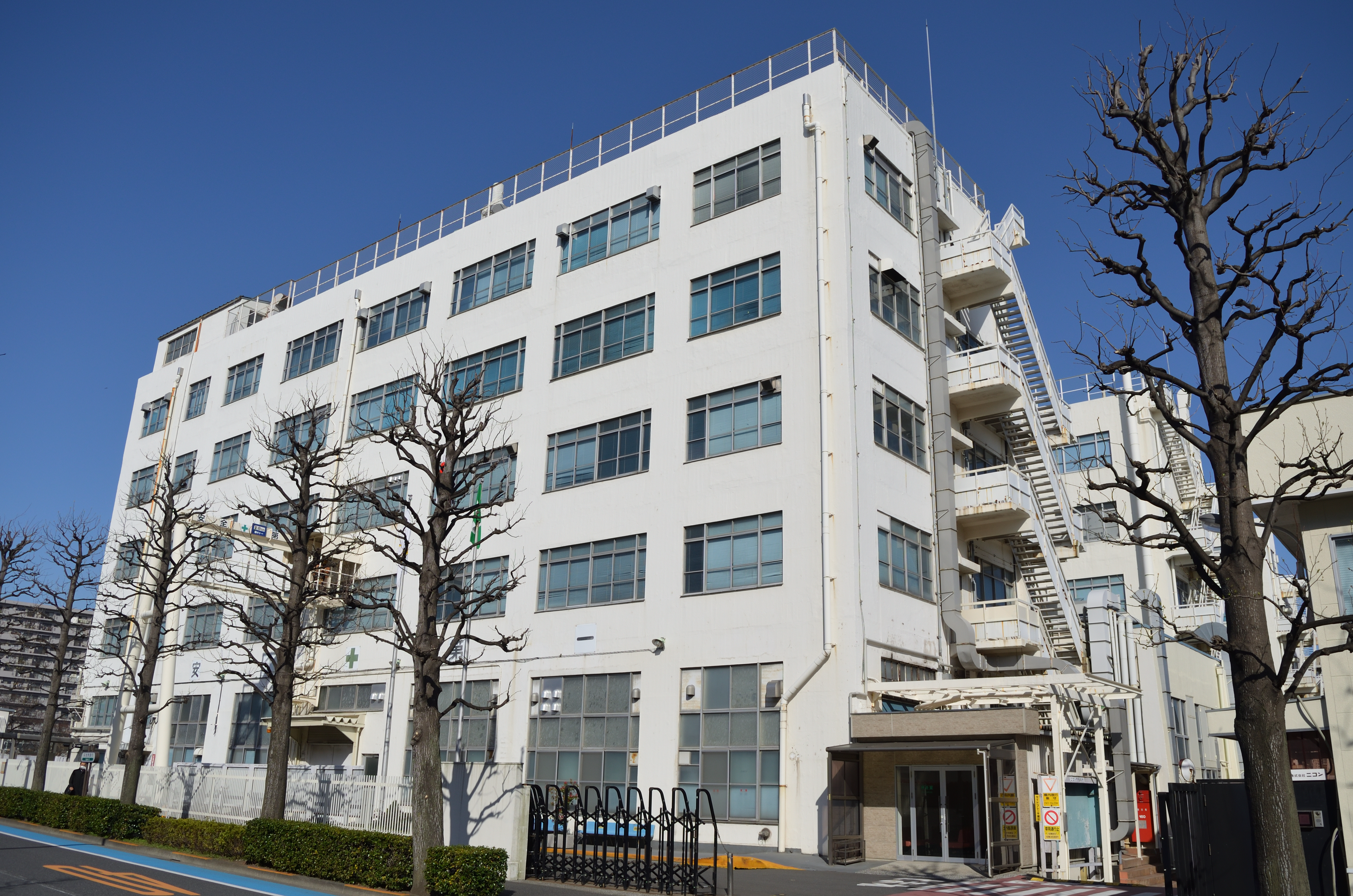
Former factory of Nikon in 2016

== Politics and government ==
The mayor of Shinagawa Ward is Kyoko Morisawa, elected on December 4, 2022. She is an independent politician born in 1978.

The Shinagawa Ward Assembly, consisting of 40 seats, held its last election on April 23, 2023.

== Places ==
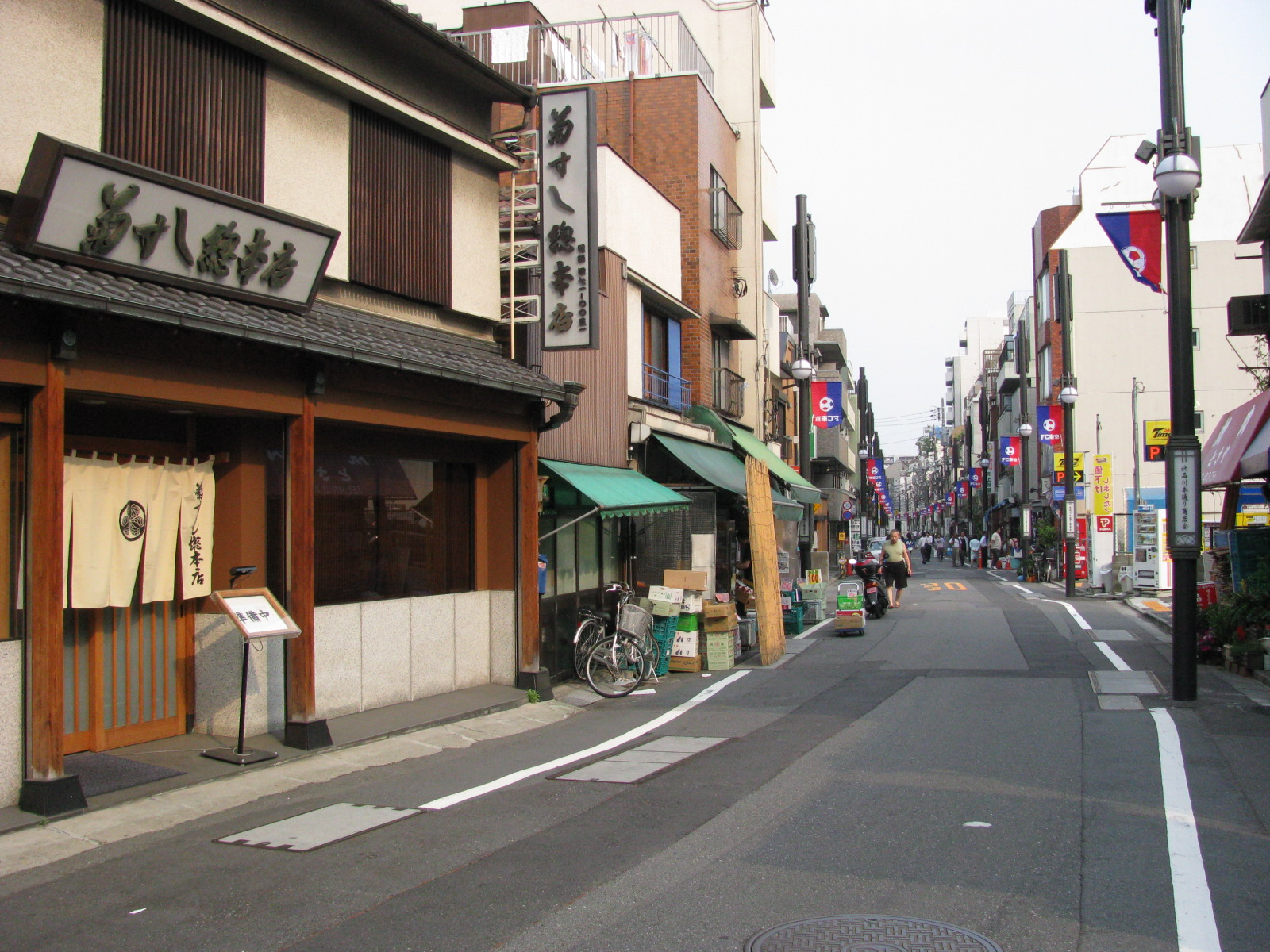
Former Shinagawa-juku Station

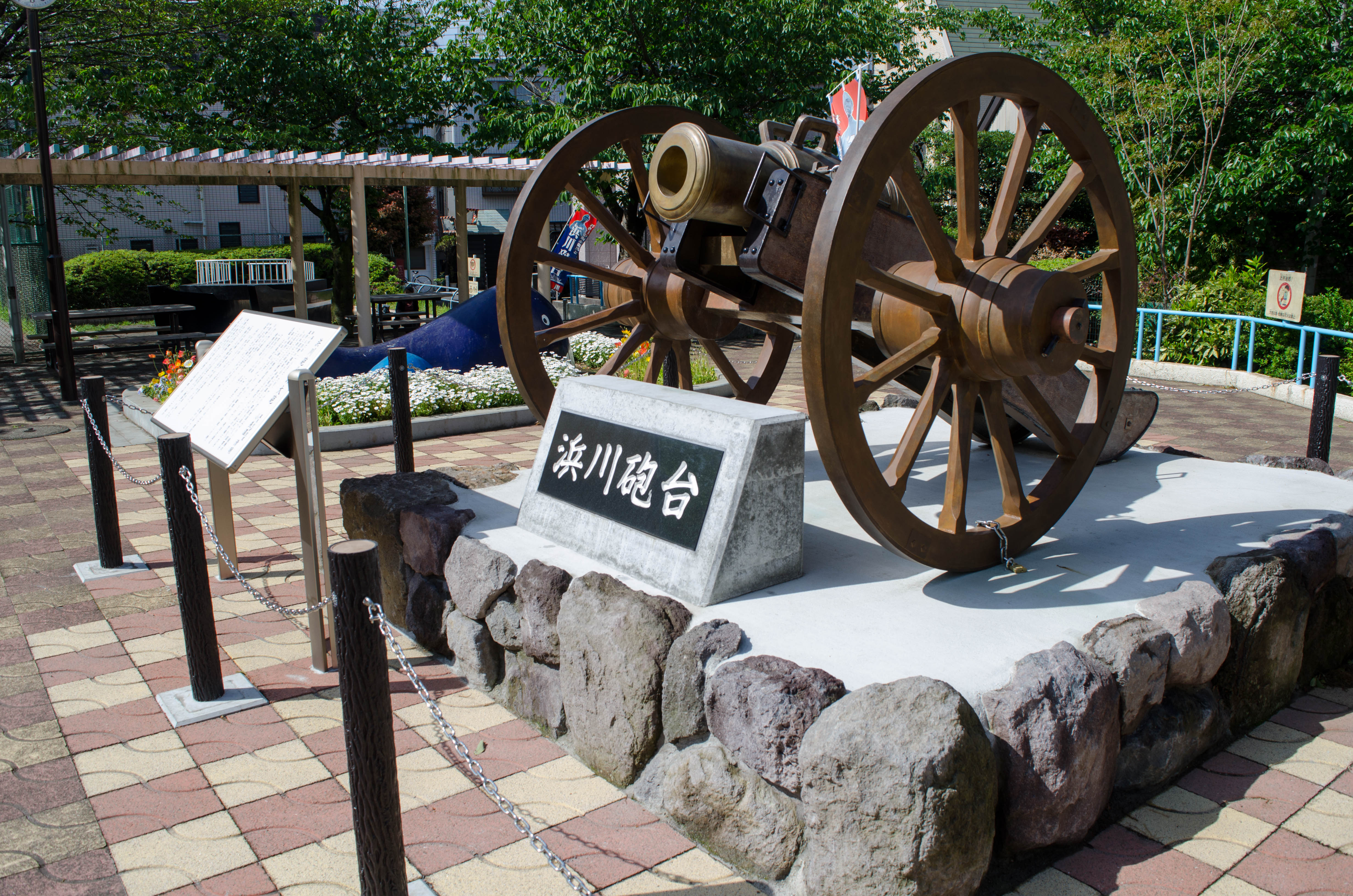
Site of Hamakawa Gun Battery

- Museums
  - ARCHI-DEPOT Museum
  - Kume Museum of Art
  - The Museum of Package Culture
  - Nikon Museum
  - O Art Museum
  - Shinagawa Historical Museum, a public local museum of Shinagawa
  - Sugino Costume Museum
- SHINAGAWA AQUARIUM
- The Galaxy Theatre
- Ohi Racecourse
- Togoshi Ginza Shopping District
- Musashi Koyama Shopping District "PALM"
- Historic sites
  - Ōmori Shell Mounds
  - Former Tōkaidō Road
    - Former Shinagawa-juku Station
    - Site of Suzugamori Execution Grounds
    - The Bridge of Tears
  - Former Shinagawa Port
  - Site of Hamakawa Gun Battery
- Parks
  - Rinshi-no-mori Park
  - Shinagawa Kumin Park
  - Ikedayama Park, site of a daimyō's villa
  - Togoshi Park, site of a daimyō's villa
- Ebara Shichi-Fuku-Jin (Seven Lucky Gods in Ebara area)
- Buddhist temples
  - Honsen-ji
  - Tōkai-ji
  - Hōren-ji
  - Tōkō-ji
- Shintō shrines
  - Shinagawa Shrine
  - Shimo-Shimmei Tenso Shrine
  - Ebara Shrine
  - Ōi Kashima Shrine
  - Hebikubo Shrine
- Churches
  - Meguro Catholic Church (St. Anselm's Church)
  - St. Stephen's Church, Tokyo St. Mary's Church – Anglican churches
  - Christ Shinagawa Church – a Presbyterian church
  - Shinagawa Baptist Church, Oi Baptist Church
  - Kreuzkirche Tokyo - a German-speaking Protestant Church

== Education ==
=== Higher education ===
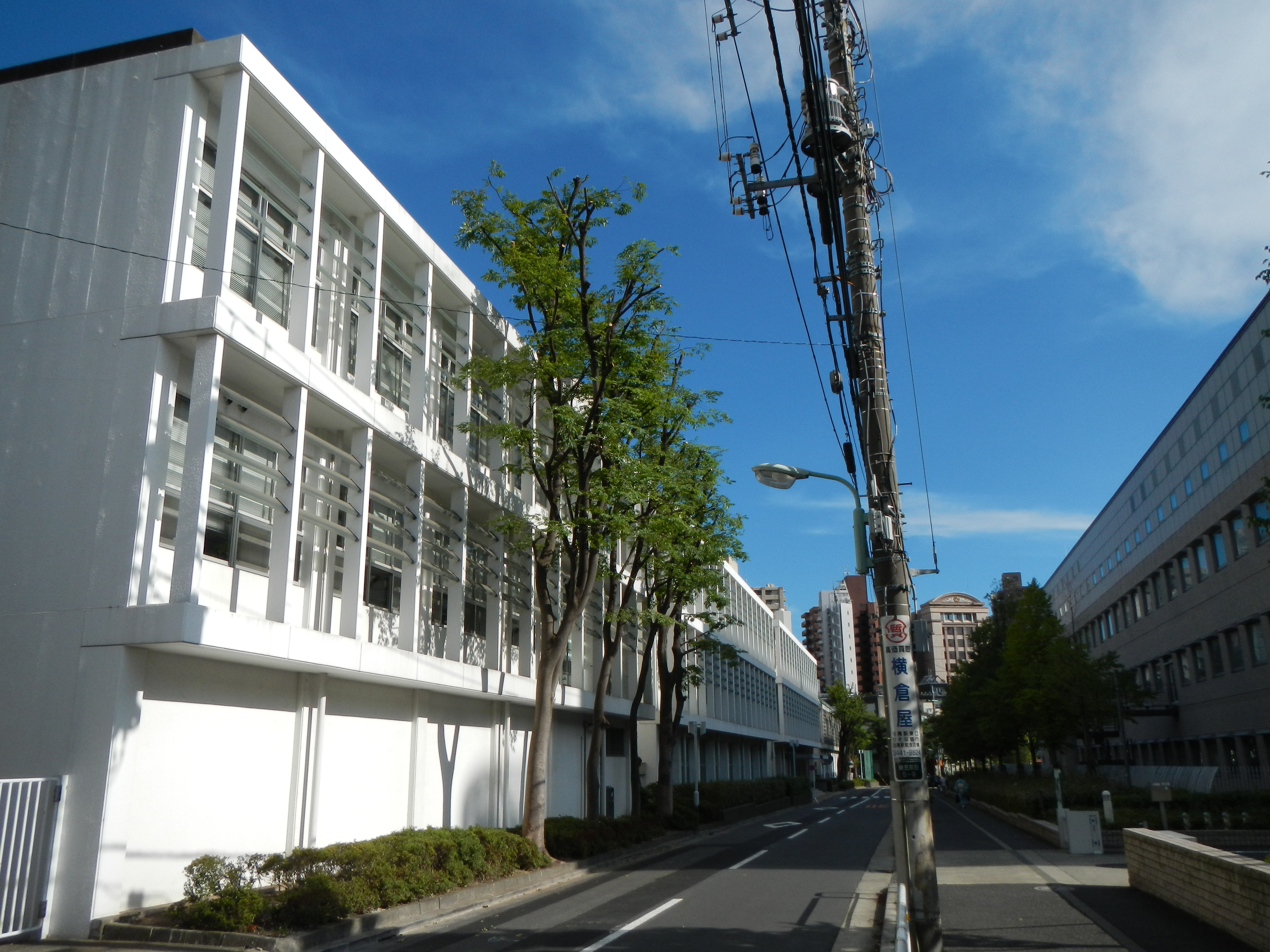
Tokyo Healthcare University

- Hoshi University
- Rissho University
- Seisen University
- Showa University
- Tokyo Healthcare University
- Sugino Fashion College
- Advanced Institute of Industrial Technology – a graduate school
- Tokyo Metropolitan College of Industrial Technology – a college of technology (kōsen)

=== Primary and secondary education ===
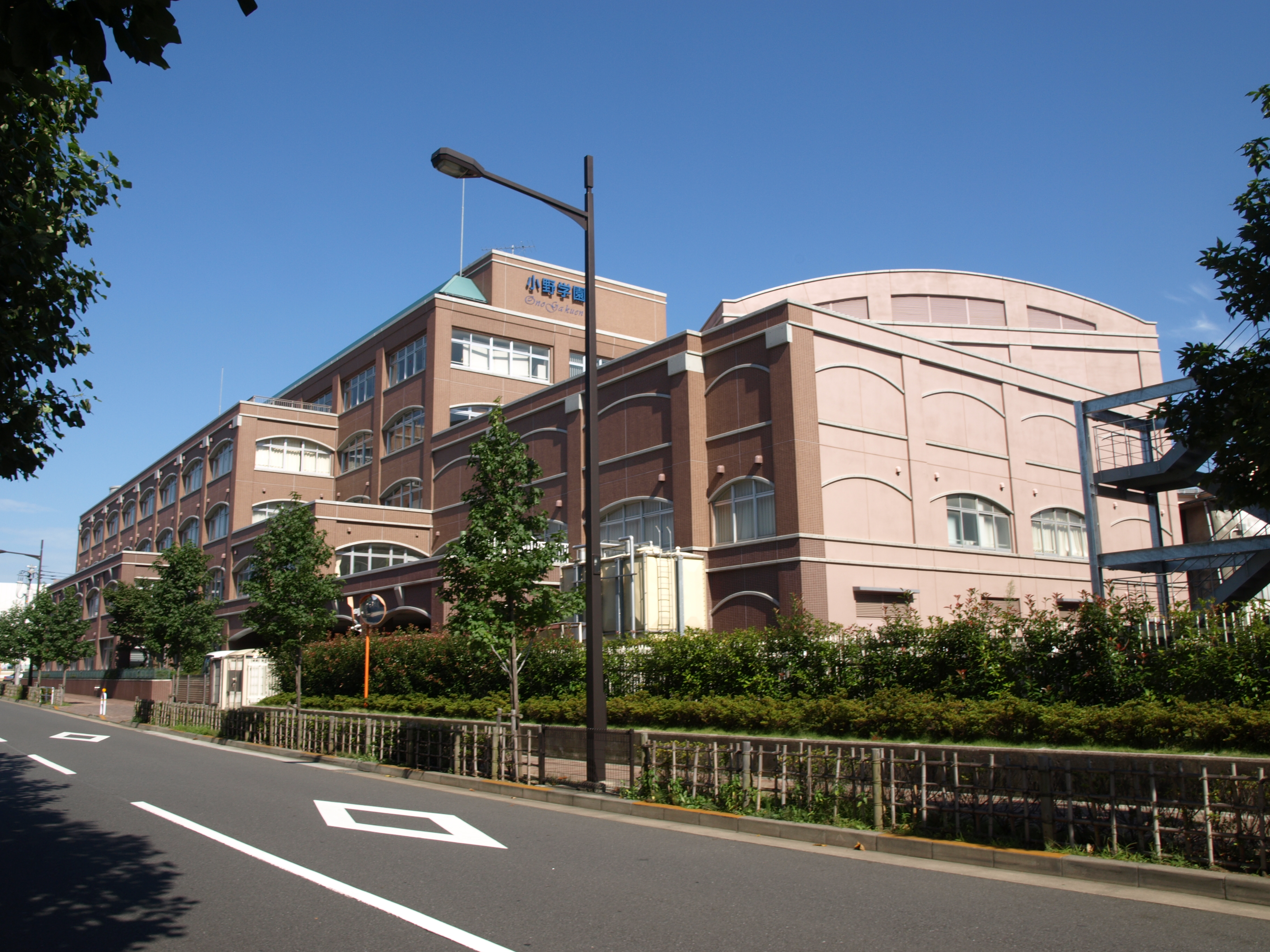
Shinagawa Shouei Junior High School & Senior High School

Public elementary and junior high schools are operated by the Shinagawa Ward Board of Education. Public high schools are operated by the Tokyo Metropolitan Government Board of Education.

- Metropolitan high schools
  - Tokyo Metropolitan Koyamadai High School
  - Tokyo Metropolitan Ōsaki High School
  - Tokyo Metropolitan Yashio High School
- Private high schools
  - The Junior High and Senior High School affiliated to the Bunkyo University
  - Hoyu-Gakuin High School
  - Kogyokusha Junior High and Senior High School
  - Shinagawa Gakugei High School
  - St. Hilda's School (Kōran Jogakkō Junior High and Senior High School)
  - Shinagawa Etoile Girls' High School
  - Shinagawa Joshi Gakuin Junior High and Senior High School
  - Shinagawa Shouei Junior High School & Senior High School
  - Seiryo Junior High and Senior High School
- International schools
  - Canadian International School in Tokyo
  - KAIS International School
- Special education schools
  - Tokyo Metropolitan Shinagawa Special Needs Education School – public school for intellectually disabled children
  - Meisei Gakuen – private deaf school

Municipal combined elementary and junior high schools:

- Ebara Hiratsuka Gakuen (荏原平塚学園)
- Hino Gakuen (日野学園)
- Houyou no Mori Gakuen (豊葉の杜学園)
- Ito Gakuen (伊藤学園)
- Shinagawa Gakuen (品川学園)
- Yashio Gakuen (八潮学園)

Municipal junior high schools:

- Ebara No. 1 Junior High School (荏原第一中学校)
- Ebara No. 5 Junior High School (荏原第五中学校)
- Ebara No. 6 Junior High School (荏原第六中学校)
- Fujimidai Junior High School (冨士見台中学校)
- Hamakawa Junior High School (浜川中学校)
- Osaki Junior High School (大崎中学校)
- Suzugamori Junior High School (鈴ヶ森中学校)
- Togoshidai Junior High School (戸越台中学校)
- Tokai Junior High School (東海中学校)

Municipal elementary schools:

- No. 2 Enzan Elementary School (第二延山小学校)
- No. 1 Hino Elementary School (第一日野小学校)
- No. 3 Hino Elementary School (第三日野小学校)
- No. 4 Hino Elementary School (第四日野小学校)
- Asamadai Elementary School (浅間台小学校)
- Daiba Elementary School (台場小学校)
- Enzan Elementary School (延山小学校)
- Genjimae Elementary School (源氏前小学校)
- Gotenyama Elementary School (御殿山小学校)
- Hamakawa Elementary School (浜川小学校)
- Hatanodai Elementary School (旗台小学校)
- Hosui Elementary School (芳水小学校)
- Ito Elementary School (伊藤小学校)
- Jonan Elementary School (城南小学校)
- Jonan No. 2 Elementary School (城南第二小学校)
- Kamishinmei Elementary School (上神明小学校)
- Keiyo Elementary School (京陽小学校)
- Koyama Elementary School (小山小学校)
- Koyamadai Elementary School (小山台小学校)
- Mitsugi Elementary School (三木小学校)
- Miyamae Elementary School (宮前小学校)
- Nakanobu Elementary School (中延小学校)
- Ōhara Elementary School (大原小学校)
- Ōi No. 1 Elementary School (大井第一小学校)
- Samehama Elementary School (鮫浜小学校)
- Shimizudai Elementary School (清水台小学校)
- Suzugamori Elementary School (鈴ヶ森小学校)
- Tachiai Elementary School (立会小学校)
- Togoshi Elementary School (戸越小学校)
- Ushiroji Elementary School (後地小学校)
- Yamanaka Elementary School (山中小学校)

== Transport ==
=== Important railway stations ===
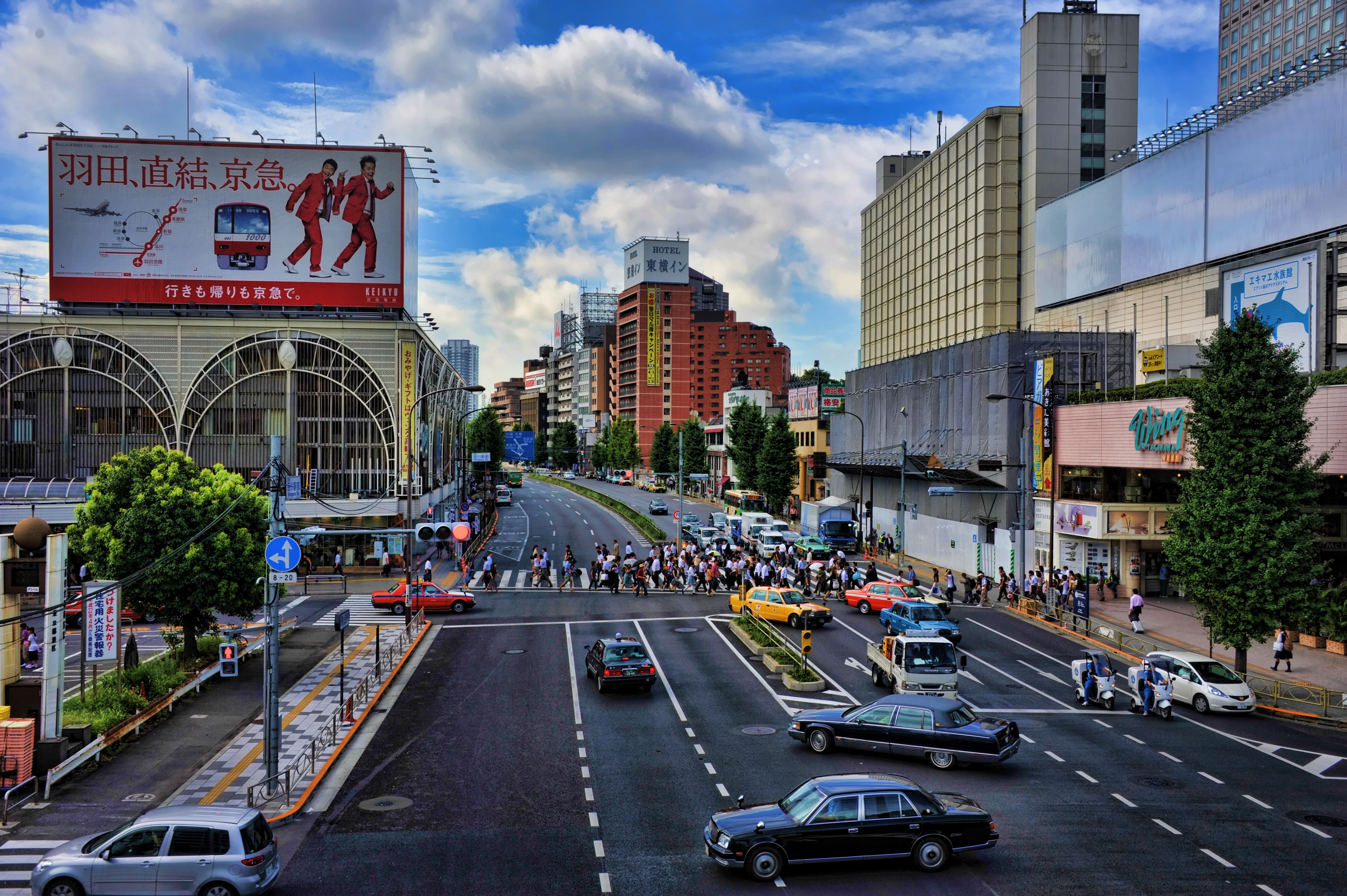
Exterior of Shinagawa Station in Minato

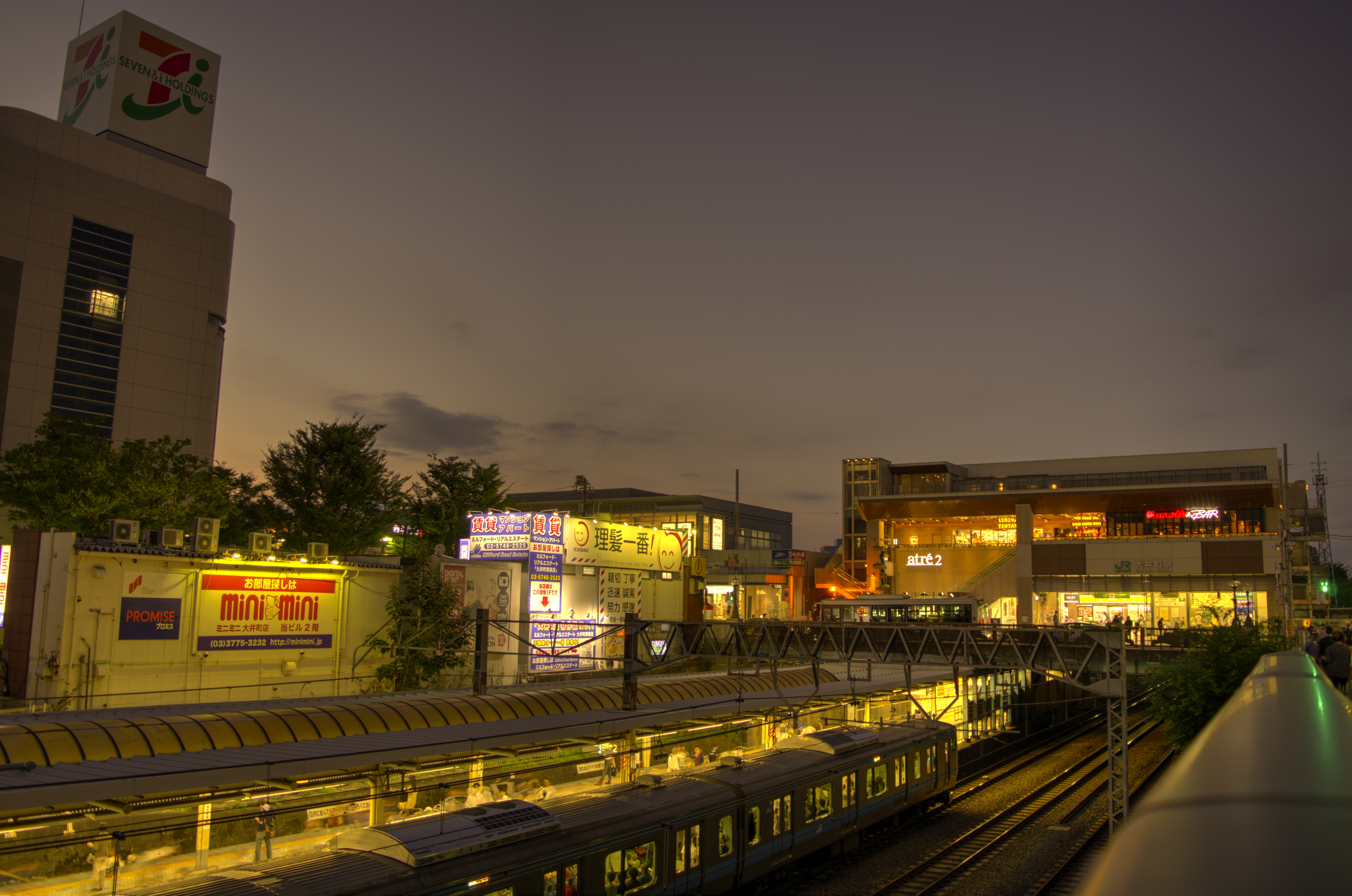
Ōimachi Station at Ōi, Shinagawa

- Gotanda Station
- Meguro Station
- Ōimachi Station
- Ōsaki Station

Shinagawa Station is in fact located in neighboring Minato but also serves the northern part of Shinagawa, and is a stop on the high-speed Tōkaidō Shinkansen line.

=== Rail ===
- East Japan Railway Company (JR East)
  - Yamanote Line: Ōsaki, Gotanda and Meguro Stations
  - Keihin-Tōhoku Line: Ōimachi Station
  - Saikyō Line: Ōsaki Station
  - Tōkaidō Main Line: does not stop at the stations in Shinagawa
  - Yokosuka Line: Nishi-Ōi Station
  - Shōnan-Shinjuku Line: Ōsaki and Nishi-Ōi Stations
- Tokyu Corporation (Tōkyū)
  - Tōkyū Meguro Line: Meguro, Fudō-mae, Musashi-Koyama and Nishi-Koyama Stations
  - Tōkyū Ōimachi Line: Shimo-Shinmei and Togoshi-kōen, Nakanobu, Ebaramachi and Hatanodai Stations
  - Tōkyū Ikegami Line: Gotanda, Ōsaki-Hirokōji, Togoshi-Ginza, Ebara-Nakanobu and Hatanodai Stations
- Tokyo Waterfront Area Rapid Transit (Rinkai Line): Tennōzu Isle, Shinagawa Seaside, Ōimachi and Ōsaki Stations
- Tokyo Monorail: Tennōzu Isle and Ōi Keibajō Mae Stations
- Keikyu Corporation (Keikyū)
  - Keikyū Main Line: Kitashinagawa, Shimbamba, Aomono-yokochō, Samezu, Tachiaigawa and Ōmorikaigan Stations
- Tokyo Metro
  - Namboku Line: Meguro Station
- Tokyo Metropolitan Bureau of Transportation (Toei)
  - Mita Line: Meguro Station
  - Asakusa Line: Gotanda, Togoshi and Nakanobu Stations

=== Road ===
- Shuto Expressway (Shutokō)
  - Route 1 "Haneda Sen"
  - Route 2 "Meguro Sen"
  - Bayshore Route "Wangan Sen"
  - Central Circular Route "Chūō Kanjō Sen"
- National highways
  - Route 1 "Sakurada Dōri", "Dai-Ni Keihin"
  - Route 15 "Dai-Ichi Keihin"
  - Route 357 "Tokyo Wangan Dōro"

Shinagawa is also home to the main motor vehicle registration facility for central Tokyo (located east of Samezu Station). As a result, many license plates in Tokyo are labeled with the name "Shinagawa."

== Major incidents / accidents ==
- 1863 – British Liberines burning case
- 1964 – Shinagawa Katsushima warehouse explosion fire
- 1987 – Explosion accident at the Ōi Thermal Power Plant
- 1995 – Death case of arrest and detention of public affairs notary public office

== International relations ==
=== Sister city and friendship cities ===
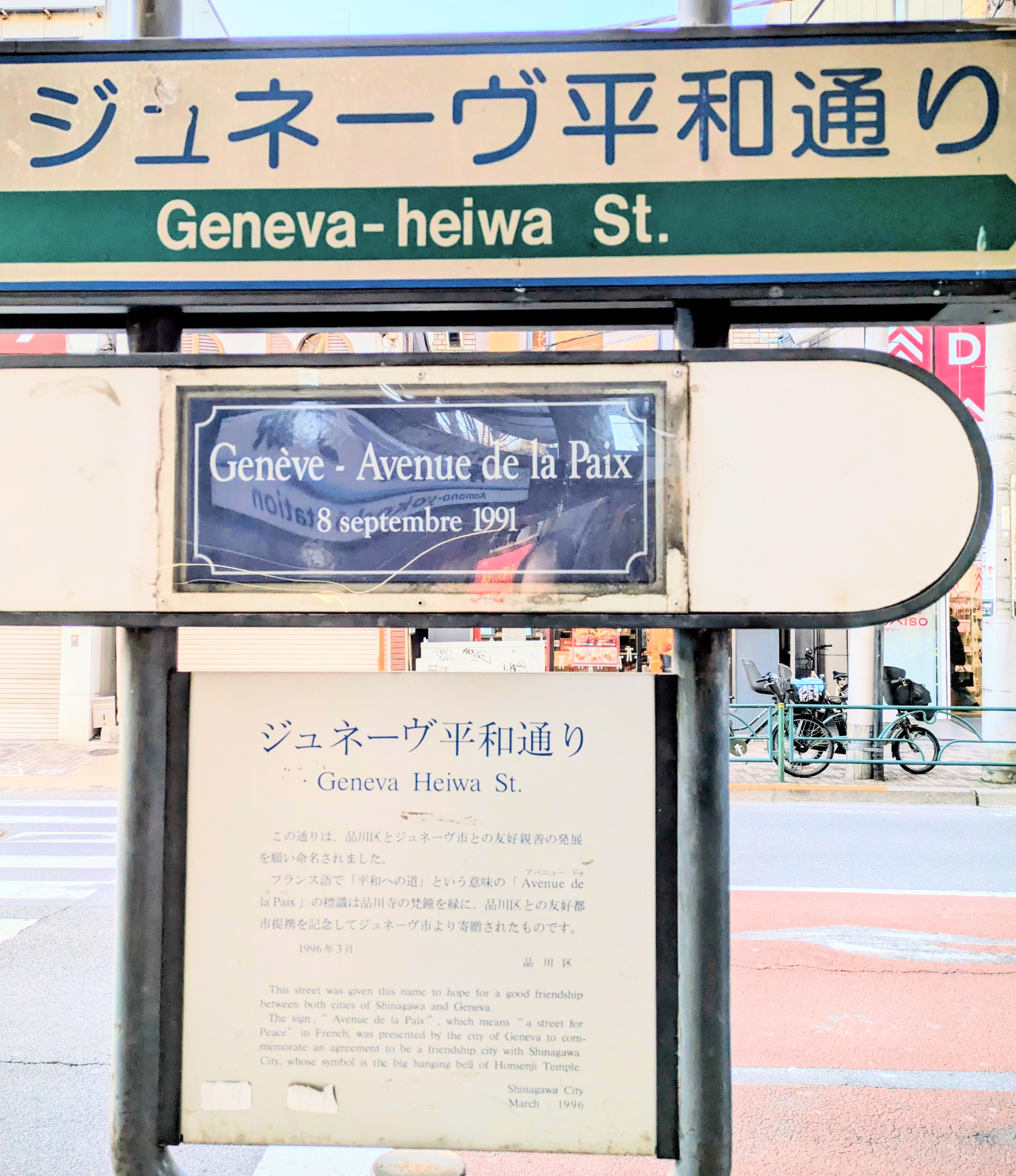
Geneva-heiwa Street in Minamishinagawa, Shinagawa

Sister city

- Portland, Maine, the United States of America (since 1984)

Friendship cities

- (Switzerland) Geneva, Swiss Confederation (since 1991)
- Auckland, New Zealand (since 1993)

=== Diplomatic missons in Shinagawa ===
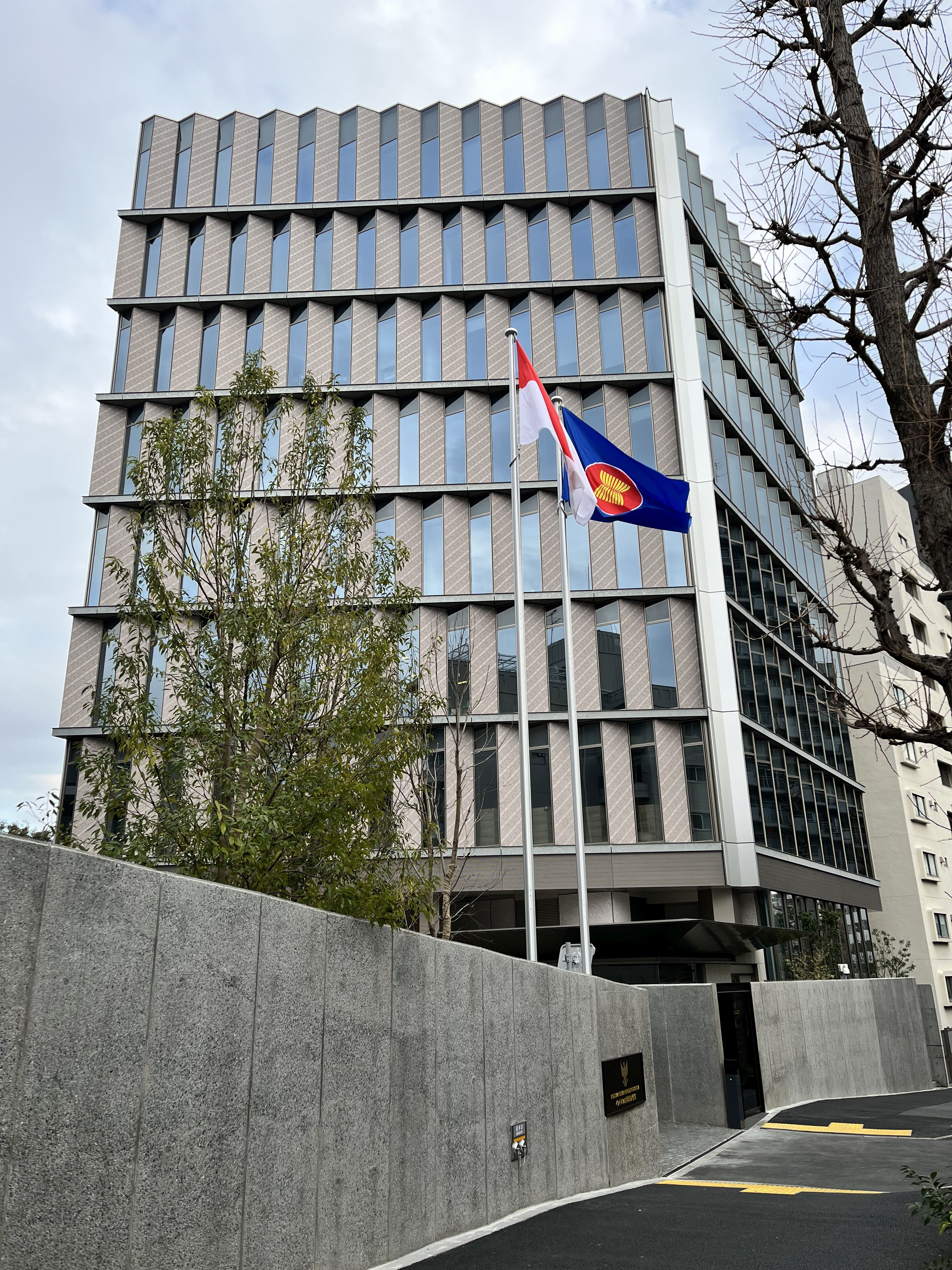
Embassy of Indonesia in Higashigotanda, Shinagawa

Embassies

- Belarus
- Brunei
- Colombia
- Djibouti
- Indonesia
- Mali
- Myanmar
- North Macedonia
- Tajikistan
- Thailand
- Zambia

Consulates-general

- Brazil
- Peru

== In popular culture ==
- Godzilla, Shin Godzilla
- Haguregumo
- Lucky Seven
- Sun in the Last Days of the Shogunate

== Notable people from Shinagawa ==
- Tadasuke Akiyama, photographer
- Shizuka Arakawa, figure skater
- Nobutoshi Canna (Real Name: Nobutoshi Hayashi, Nihongo: 林 延年, Hayashi Nobutoshi), actor, voice actor, singer and narrator
- Char (Real Name: Hisato Takenaka, Nihongo: 竹中 尚人, Takenaka Hisato), musician, singer-songwriter and record producer
- Osamu Dezaki, anime director and screenwriter
- Renji Ishibashi (Real Name: Renji Ishida, Nihongo: 石田 蓮司, Ishida Renji), actor
- Kenji Kawai, composer and arranger
- Momoko Kikuchi, Japanese actress, entertainer, idol, and scholar
- Yun Kōga (Real Name: Risa Kimura, Nihongo: 木村 理沙, Kimura Risa), manga artist
- Akira Kurosawa, film director, screenwriter, and producer
- Taiki Matsuno (Real Name: Tatsuya Matsuno, Nihongo: 松野 達也, Matsuno Tatsuya), actor and voice actor
- Takeshi Mori, December 2, 1959, in Shinagawa, Tokyo, Japan), television announcer and tarento
- Keiji Nishikawa, professional shogi player ranked 8-dan
- Riho (Real Name Unknown), female professional wrestler and idol
- Yuki Sato, actor
- Chiyoko Shimakura, enka singer
- Tetsuo Suda, TV presenter and news anchor
- Issei Tamura, martial artist
- Taeko Watanabe, manga artist
- Miki Yamada, politician, member of the House of Representatives and member of the Liberal Democratic Party
- Masamoto Yashiro, businessman
- Masayoshi Takanaka (高中 正義, Takanaka Masayoshi), guitarist, composer, and producer.

== Gallery ==
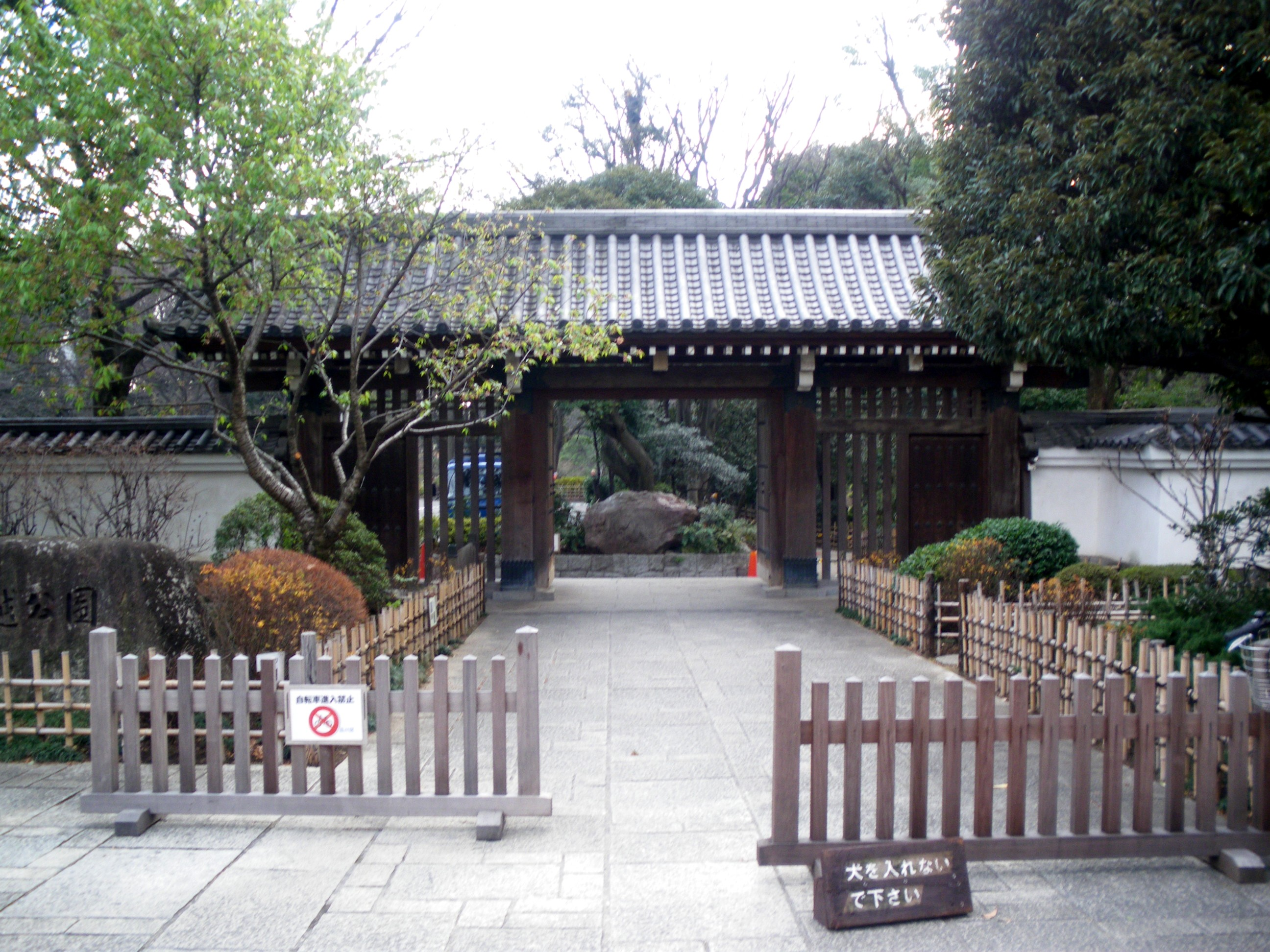
Main entrance of Togoshi Park

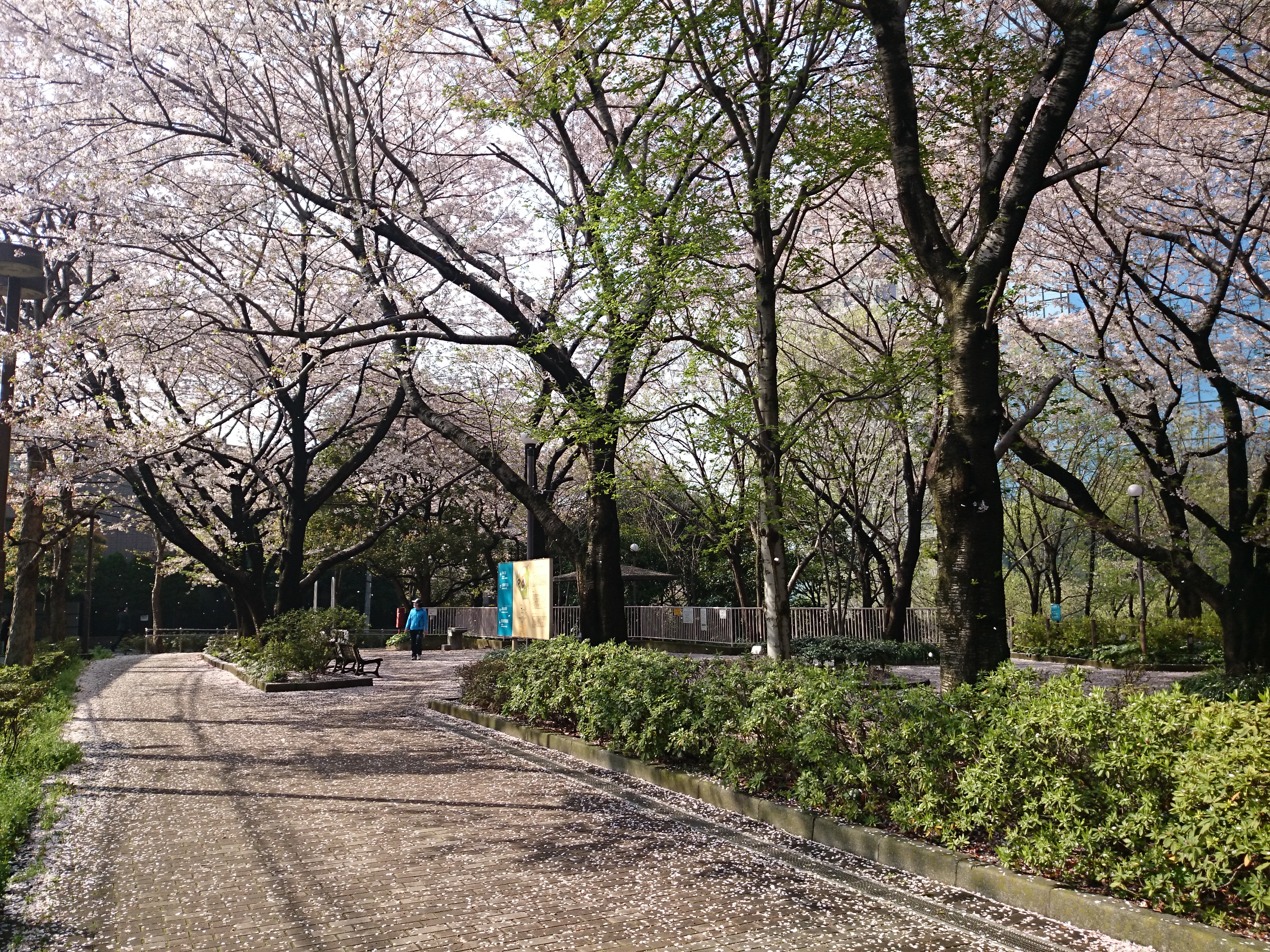
Cherry blossoms at Goten-yama Hill in Kita-Shinagawa

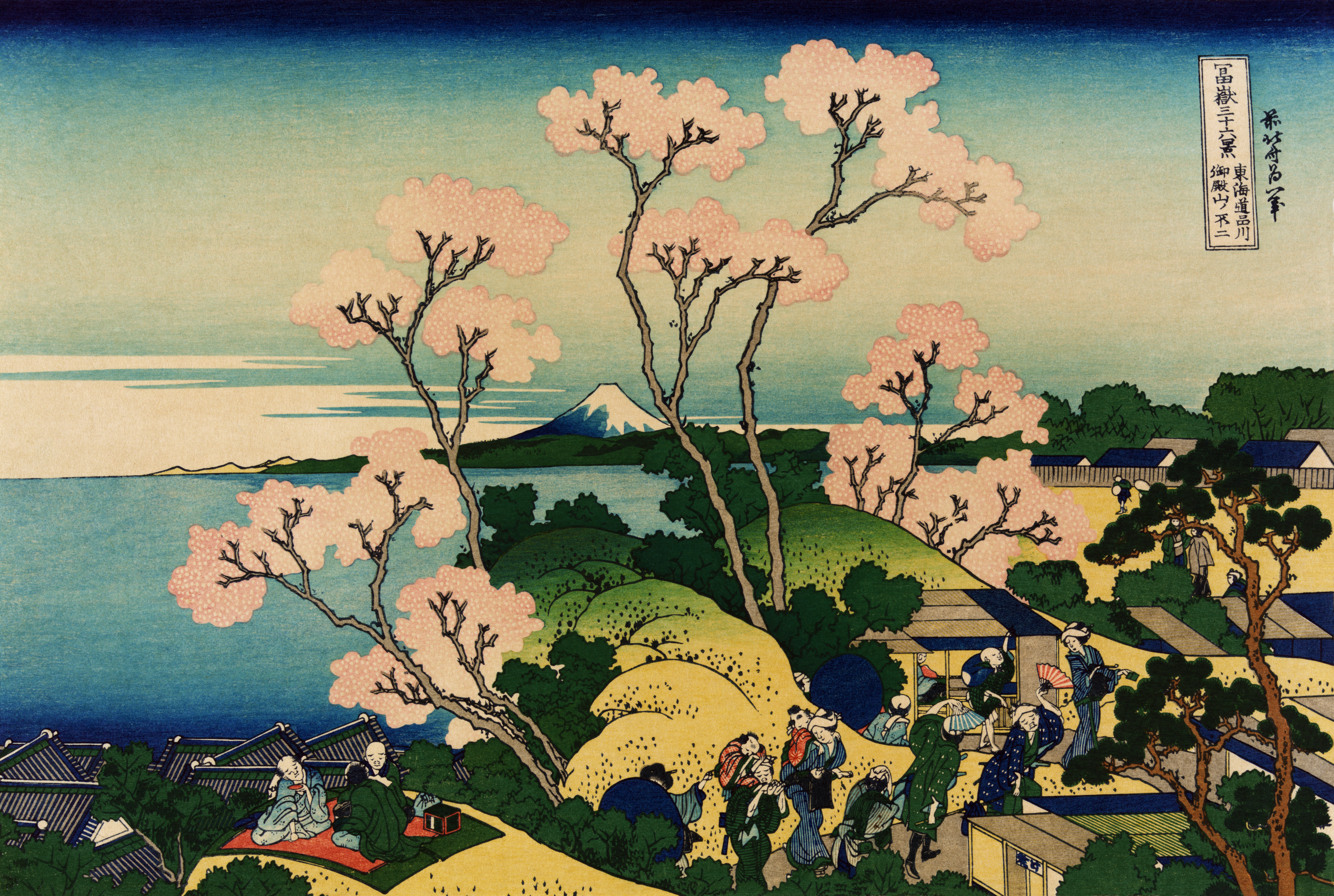
Cherry blossoms at Goten-yama Hill by Hokusai

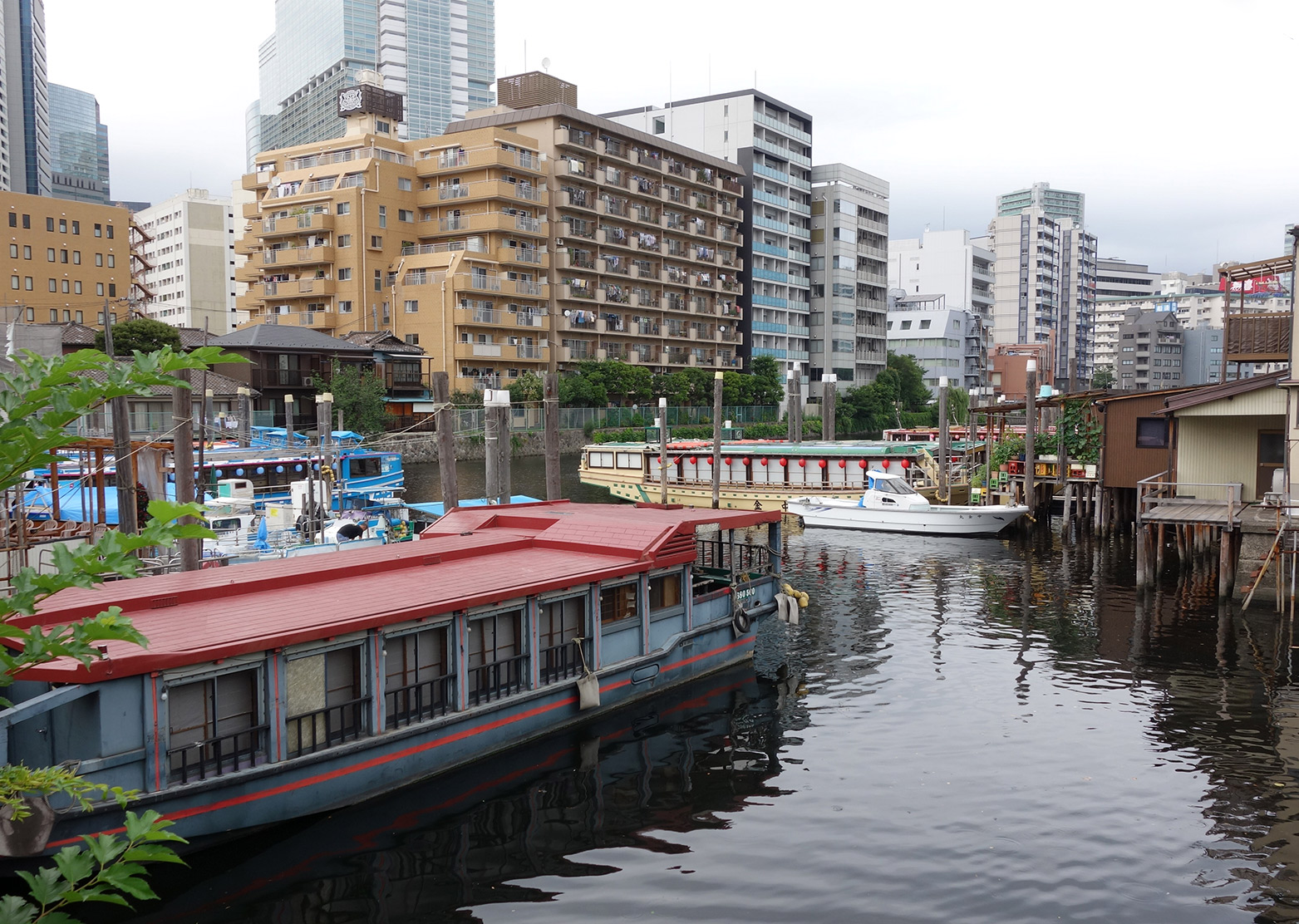
Former Shinagawa Port

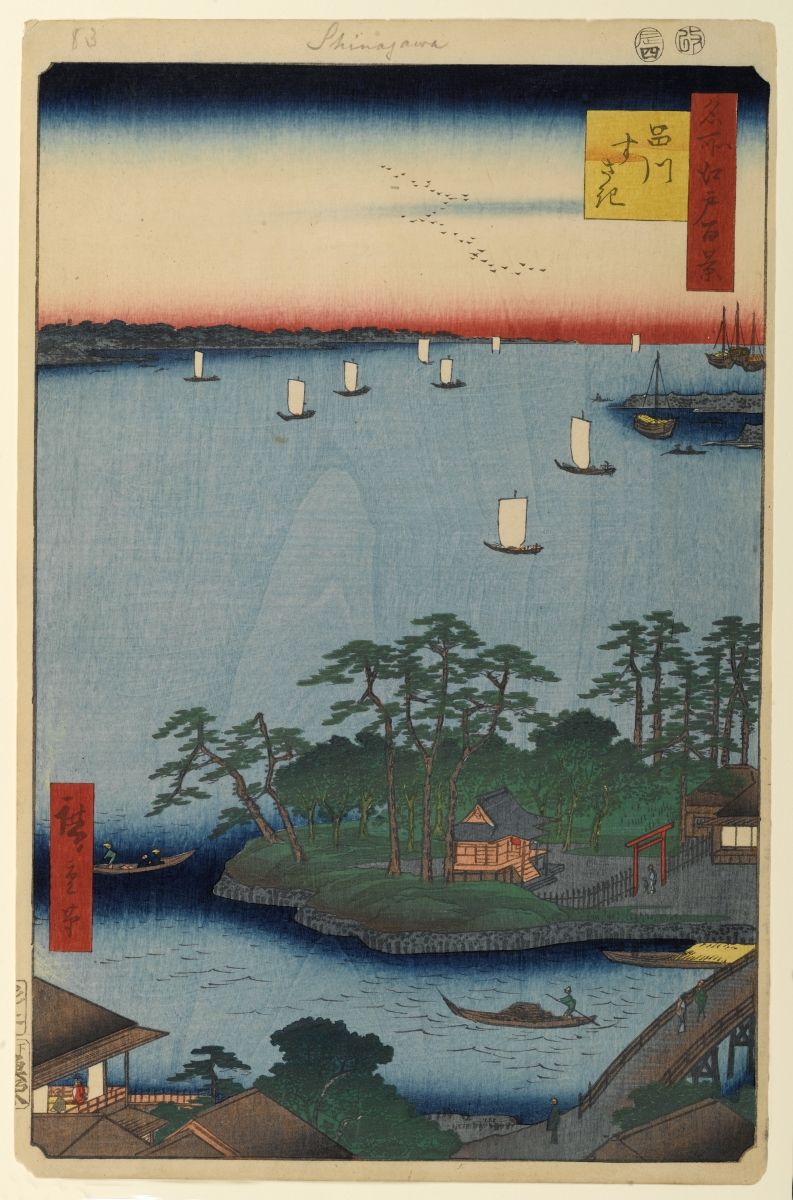
Shinagawa Port by Hiroshige

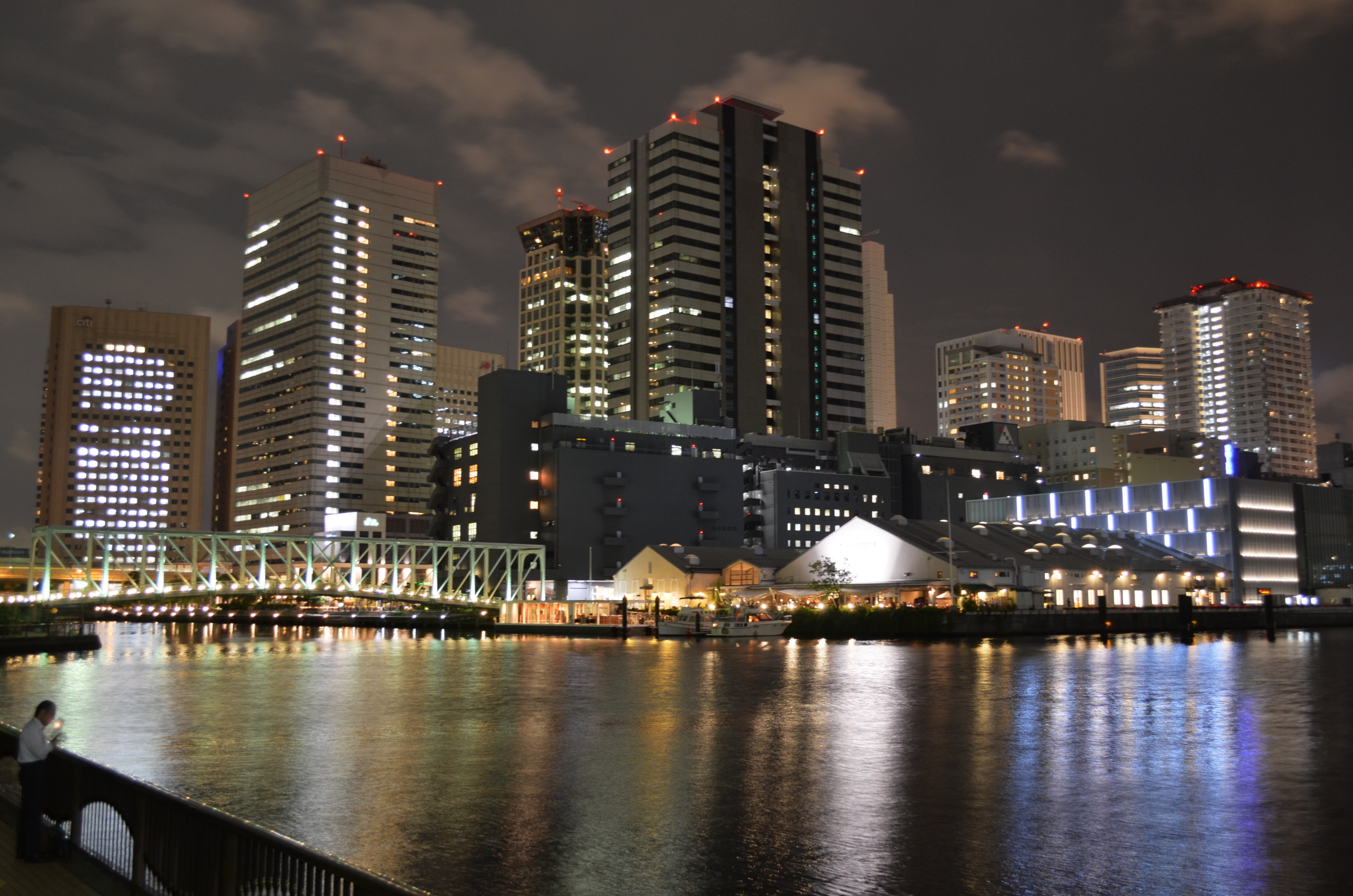
Night view of Higashi-Shinagawa
