= Togoshi-ginza Station =

Railway station in Tokyo, Japan

Togoshi-ginza Station 戸越銀座駅

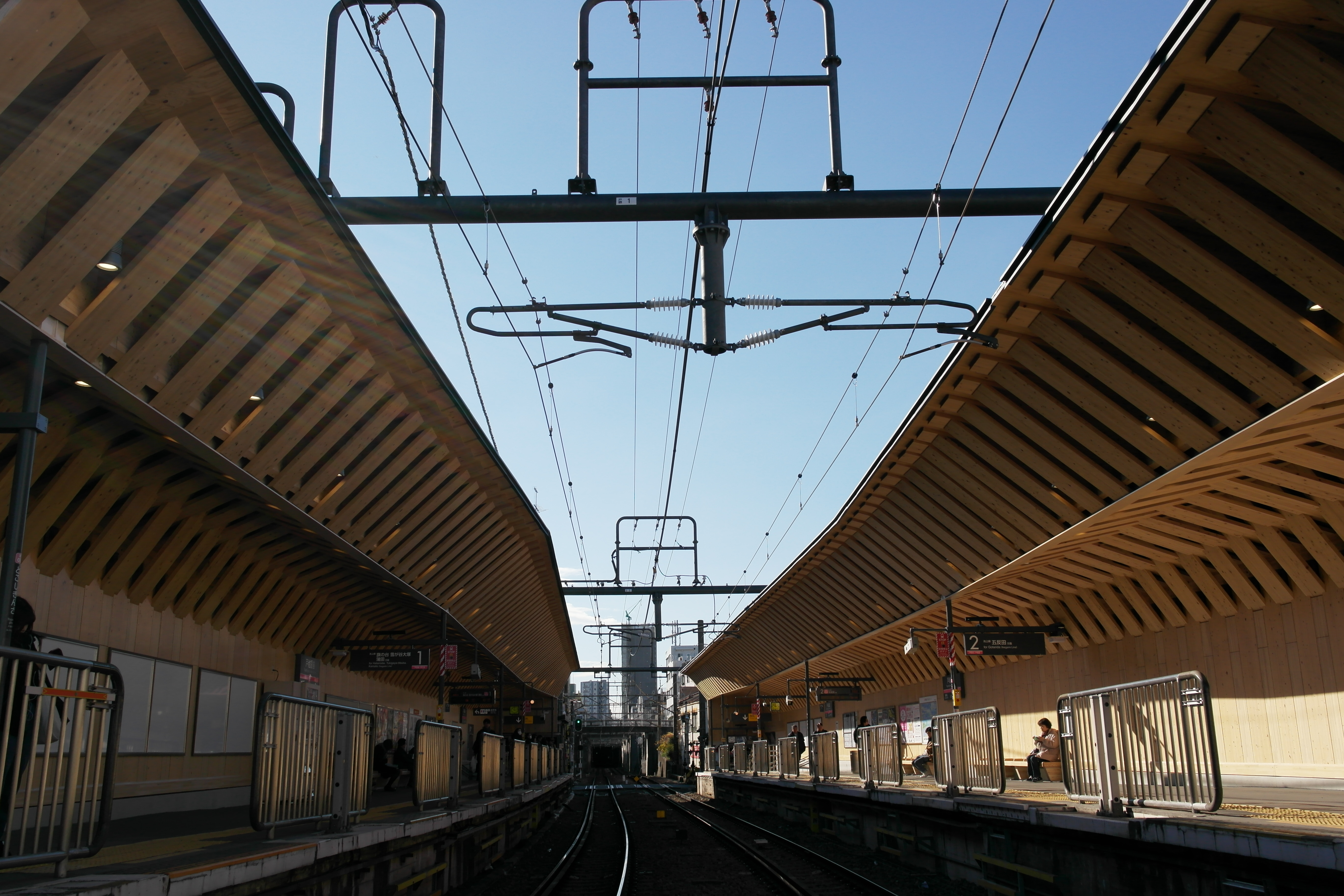

General information
- Location: 2-16-1 Hiratsuka, Shinagawa Ward, Tokyo; Japan
- Coordinates: 35°36′58″N 139°42′54″E
- Operator: Tōkyū Railways
- Line: Tokyu Ikegami Line
- Distance: 1.4 km (0.87 mi) from Gotanda
- Platforms: 2 side platforms
- Tracks: 2
- Connections: Bus stop

Construction
- Structure type: At grade

Other information
- Station code: IK03
- Website: Official website

History
- Opened: 28 August 1927; 98 years ago
- Rebuilt: 11 December 2016; 9 years ago

Passengers
- FY2011: 18,443 daily

Services
Preceding station	Tōkyū Railways	Following station
Ebara-nakanobu towards Kamata	Ikegami Line	Ōsakihirokōji towards Gotanda
Location
- Location within Special wards of Tokyo Location within Tokyo Bay and Bōsō Peninsula Location within Tokyo Location within Japan

Togoshi-ginza Station (戸越銀座駅, Togoshi-Ginza-eki) is a railway station on the Tokyu Ikegami Line in Shinagawa, Tokyo, Japan, operated by the private railway operator Tokyu Corporation.

== Lines ==
Togoshi-ginza Station is served by the 10.9 km (6.8 mi) Tokyu Ikegami Line between Gotanda and Kamata, and lies 1.4 km (0.87 mi) from Gotanda.

== Station layout ==
The station has two ground-level side platforms. There is no connecting bridge or passage between the platforms.

=== Platforms ===
1	■ Tokyu Ikegami Line	for Hatanodai, Yukigaya-Otsuka, Ikegami, and Kamata
2	■ Tokyu Ikegami Line	for Gotanda

== History ==
The station opened on August 28, 1927. It was rebuilt in 2016.

== Passenger statistics ==
In fiscal 2011, the station was used by an average of 18,443 passengers daily.

== Surrounding area ==
- Togoshi Station (Toei Asakusa Line), about 100 m (330 ft) to the east

== Bus services ==
Tokyu Bus from Togoshi-Ginza (戸越銀座) bus stop.

== See also ==
- List of railway stations in Japan
