= Sugino Yoshiko =

Japanese fashion educator and designer

- 杉野芳子
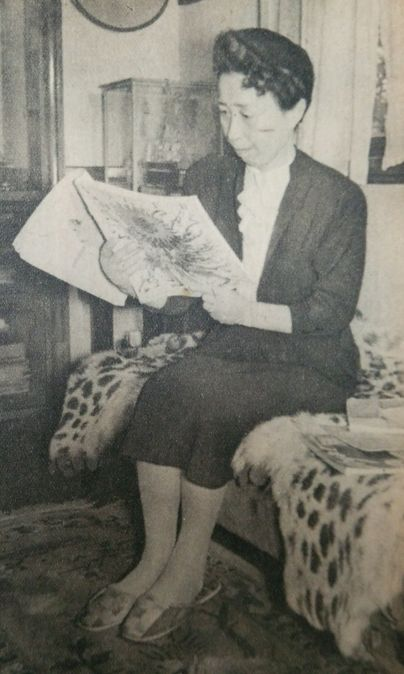
- Sugino Yoshiko in 1948
- Born: Iwasawa Yoshiko; March 2, 1892; Chiba, Japan
- Died: July 24, 1978 (aged 86)
- Occupations: Fashion educator and designer
- Known for: Founding the "Doreme" dressmaking school

Sugino Yoshiko (杉野 芳子) (née Iwasawa, March 2, 1892 – July 24, 1978) was a Japanese fashion educator and designer. She founded the Doreme dressmaking school and the Sugino Fashion College.

== Early life and education ==
Sugino was born in what is now the town of Yokoshibahikari in Chiba prefecture, Japan. Her birth name was Iwasawa Yoshiko. She attended Chiba Prefectural Girl's High School, and became the first woman to work at the Ministry of Railways. She went to study in New York in 1914. While studying abroad, she married architect Sugino Shigeichi in 1916. They returned to Japan in 1920, and lived in Akasaka, Tokyo.

== Career ==
Sugino founded the Doreme dressmaking school in 1926. At the time, all western clothing was bespoke, but using basic paper patterns she taught Japanese women how to make their own dresses. She had three students. In 1932 she formed the Sugino School from her dressmaking school. Shigeichi served as the principal. By 1936, she had 1,200 students. She also wrote sewing manuals.

In 1943 she changed the name of the school to the Sugino Fashion College. However, the school burned down in 1945, during World War II. She reopened her dressmaking school in 1946, but only prepared thirty applications. 1,700 women applied for the school. She later allowed her graduates to open franchises of the school. There were 700 franchises by 1958.

After World War II, Sugino traveled to France many times. She entered the world of haute couture, and became friends with Jacques Fath, Christian Dior, and Pierre Balmain, among others.

The Sugino Costume Museum was founded in 1957. It was the first museum of western clothing in Japan. Their collection was composed of clothing and accessories from Sugino's personal collection. Sugino was awarded the Légion d'Honneur (Chevalier) during the same year.

In 1965, Sugino was awarded the Order of the Sacred Treasure, 3rd class. She was also awarded the Order of the Precious Crown, 3rd class in 1978.

Sugino died on July 24, 1978.
