= Sugino Fashion College =

Private college in Shinagawa, Tokyo, Japan

Coordinates: 35°38′47.34″N 139°25′33.39″E

- 杉野服飾大学
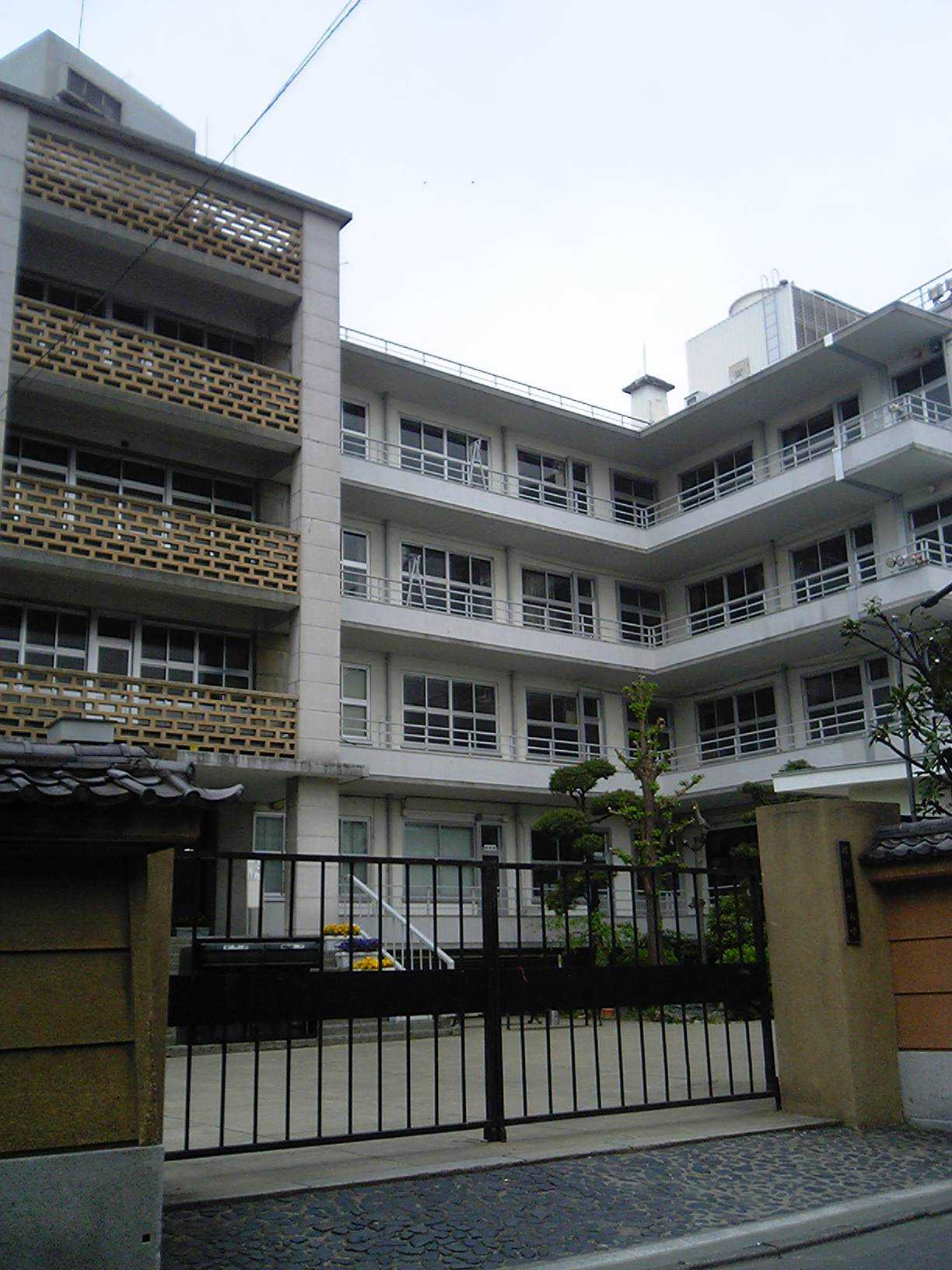
- Meguro Campus
- Former name: Sugino Women's College
- Type: Private college
- Established: 1926
- Location: Shinagawa, Tokyo, Japan
- Campus: Urban
- Website: www.sugino-fc.ac.jp

Sugino Fashion College (杉野服飾大学, Sugino fukushoku daigaku) is a private college headquartered in Shinagawa, Tokyo, Japan.

== History ==
The founder SUGINO Yoshiko (1892-1978) established a vocational school "Dressmaker School" in 1926. Then she established "Sugino Women's College" in 1964. The college was reorganized into a coeducational college "Sugino Fashion College" in 2002.

== Organization ==
=== Undergraduate programs ===
- Department of Fashion
  - Faculty of Fashion
  - Faculty of Fashion Presentation

=== Graduate programs ===
- Advanced Course for Fashion Design (one-year program)
- Master Course for Plastic Arts

== Campuses ==
=== Meguro Campus ===
- 4-6-19 Kami-Ōsaki, Shinagawa, Tokyo, 141-8652 Japan

=== Hino Campus ===
- 1006-44 Mogusa, Hino, Tokyo, 191-0033 Japan
