= Kenichi Sugino =

Video game console designer

Kenichi Sugino (杉野 憲一, Sugino Ken'ichi) is the creator and designer of most of the Game Boy line, such as Game Boy Color, Game Boy Advance SP and Game Boy Micro handheld consoles from Nintendo. They were developed at the Nintendo Research & Engineering Department where Sugino has served as a design group manager. He also created and designed Virtual Boy. After Satoru Okada retired in 2012, he became the general manager of Nintendo RED's Design Group.

Sugino eventually retired from Nintendo and became a professor at the Osaka Electro-Communication University in 2026 along with fellow Nintendo developer Goro Abe.
