= Ebara-nakanobu Station =

Railway station in Tokyo, Japan

Coordinates: 35°36′36″N 139°42′44″E

Ebara-nakanobu Station 荏原中延駅

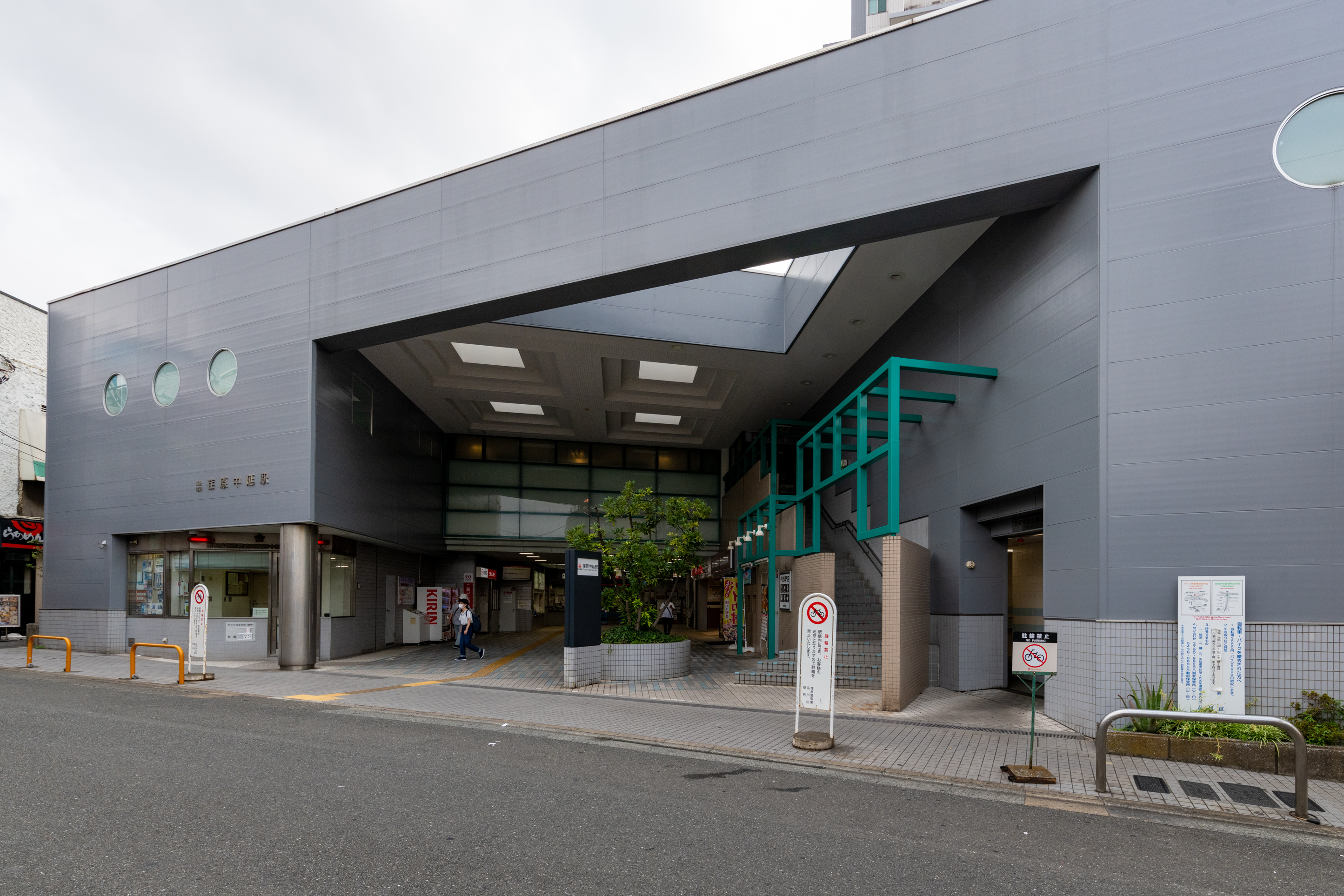

General information
- Location: Higashi-nakanobu, Shinagawa, Tokyo （東京都品川区東中延） Japan
- Operator: Tōkyū Railways
- Line: Ikegami Line
- Platforms: 2 side platforms
- Tracks: 2
- Connections

Construction
- Structure type: Underground

Other information
- Station code: IK04

History
- Opened: 28 August 1927; 99 years ago

Passengers
- 2021: 11,006 daily

Services
Preceding station	Tōkyū Railways	Following station
Hatanodai towards Kamata	Ikegami Line	Togoshi-ginza towards Gotanda
Location
- Location within Special wards of Tokyo Location within Tokyo Bay and Bōsō Peninsula Location within Tokyo Location within Japan

Ebara-nakanobu Station (荏原中延駅, -eki) is a railway station in Shinagawa, Tokyo, Japan, operated by Tokyu Railways. Nakanobu Station is located on the other end of Nakanobu Skip Road from this station.

== Station layout ==
The station consists of two ground-level side platforms.

1	■ Ikegami Line	Hatanodai ・ Yukigaya-Ōtsuka ・ Ikegami ・ Kamata
2	■ Ikegami Line	Togoshi-Ginza ・ Gotanda

== History ==
The Tokyu station opened on 28 August 1927.
