= Oyamadai Station =

Railway station in Tokyo, Japan

Coordinates: 35.6071°N 139.6537°E

Oyamadai Station 尾山台駅

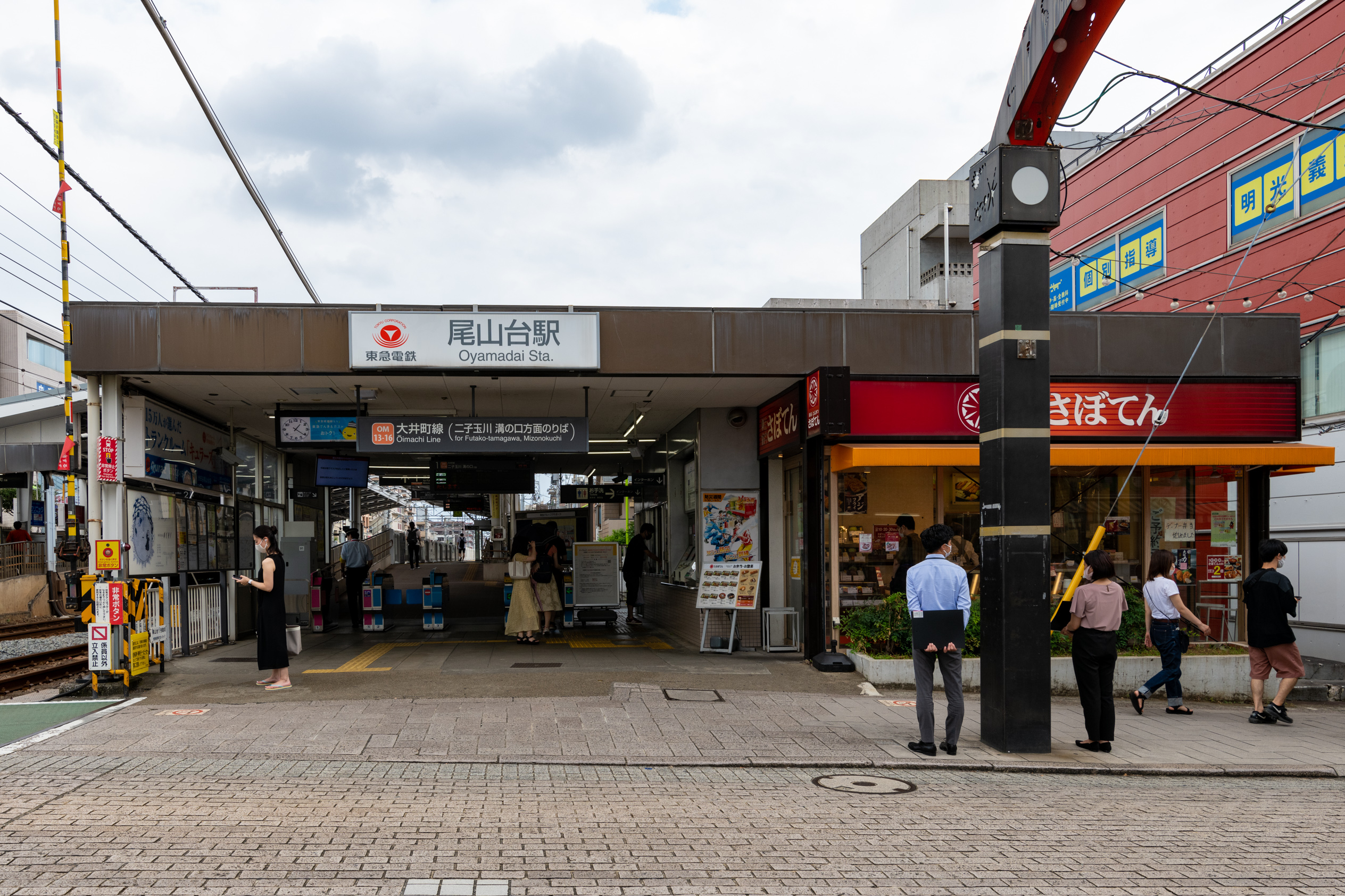
- Entrance to Track No. 1

General information
- Location: 3-chome, Oyamadai, Setagaya, Tokyo （東京都世田谷区尾山台３丁目） Japan
- Operator: Tōkyū Railways
- Line: Ōimachi Line
- Platforms: 2 side platforms
- Tracks: 2
- Connections: Bus stop

Construction
- Structure type: At grade

Other information
- Station code: OM12

History
- Opened: 1 April 1930; 96 years ago

Services
Preceding station	Tōkyū Railways	Following station
Todoroki towards Mizonokuchi	Ōimachi Line Local Local	Kuhombutsu towards Ōimachi
Location
- Location within Special wards of Tokyo Location within Tokyo Bay and Bōsō Peninsula Location within Tokyo Location within Japan

Oyamadai Station (尾山台駅, Oyamadai-eki) is a station on the Tokyu Oimachi Line located in Setagaya, Tokyo, Japan.

== Station layout ==
Two ground-level side platforms.

1	■ Oimachi Line	Futako-Tamagawa ・(Tokyu Den-en-Toshi Line) Saginuma ・ Chūō-Rinkan
2	■ Oimachi Line	Jiyūgaoka ・ Ō-okayama ・ Hatanodai ・ Ōimachi

== History ==
- April 1, 1930 Opened.

== Bus services ==
- Oyamadai Station (尾山台駅, -eki) bus stop
  - Tokyu Bus
    - <等01>Todoroki - Tamadzutsumi - Oyamadai Sta. - Todoroki (loop line)

== Around The Station ==
- Tokyo City University
