= Shimo-shimmei Station =

Railway station in Tokyo, Japan

Coordinates: 35.6088°N 139.7261°E

Shimo-Shimmei Station 下神明駅

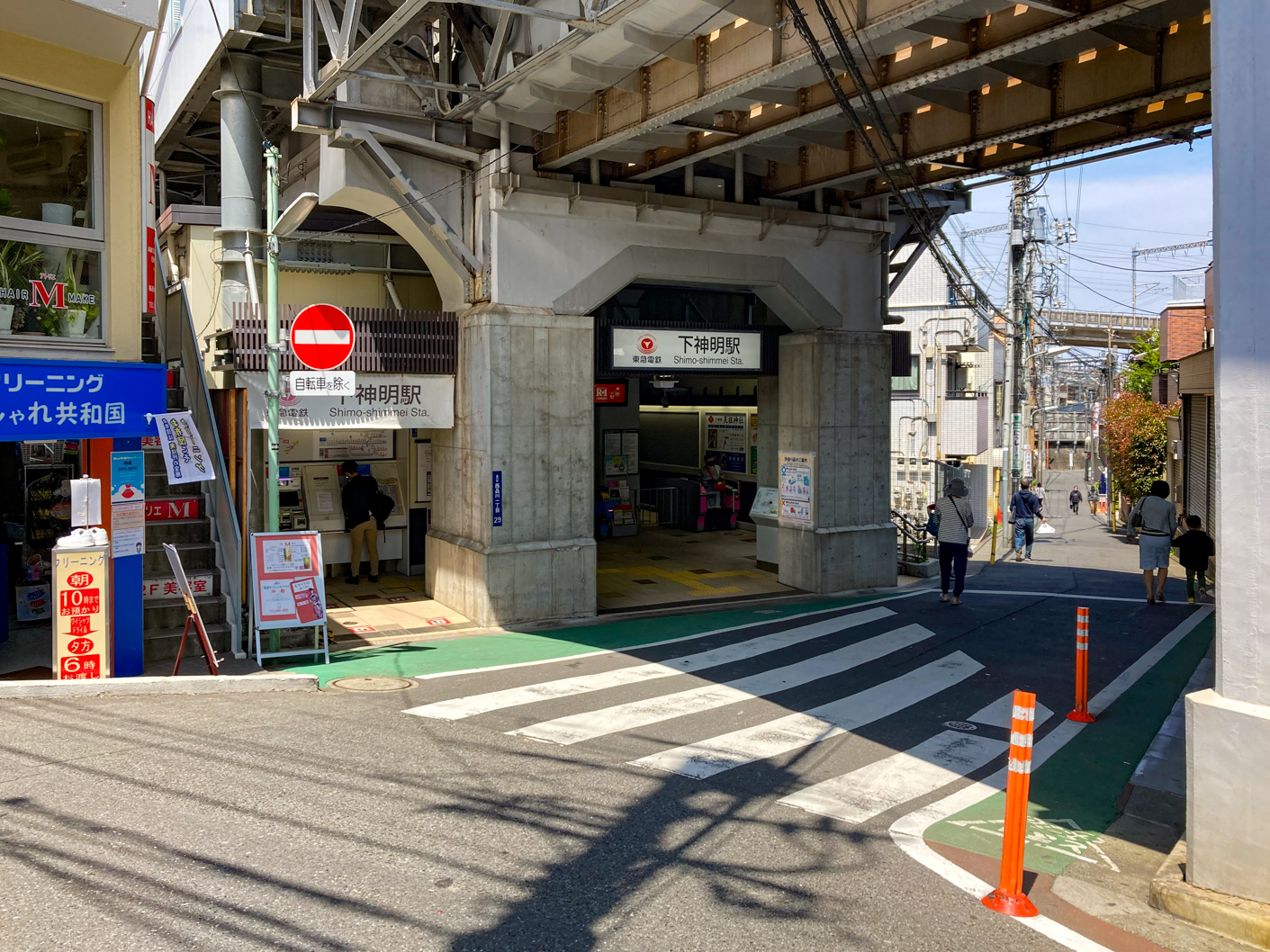
- Entrance, 2021

General information
- Location: Nishi-Shinagawa 1-chome, Shinagawa Special Ward, Tokyo （東京都品川区西品川１丁目） Japan
- Operator: Tōkyū Railways
- Line: Ōimachi Line
- Platforms: 2 side platforms
- Tracks: 2
- Connections

Construction
- Structure type: Elevated

Other information
- Station code: OM02

History
- Opened: 6 July 1927; 99 years ago
- Former names: Togoshi (until 1936)

Passengers
- 2014: 7,434 daily

Services
Preceding station	Tōkyū Railways	Following station
Togoshi-kōen towards Mizonokuchi	Ōimachi Line Local Local	Ōimachi Terminus
Location
- Location within Special wards of Tokyo Location within Tokyo Bay and Bōsō Peninsula Location within Tokyo Location within Japan

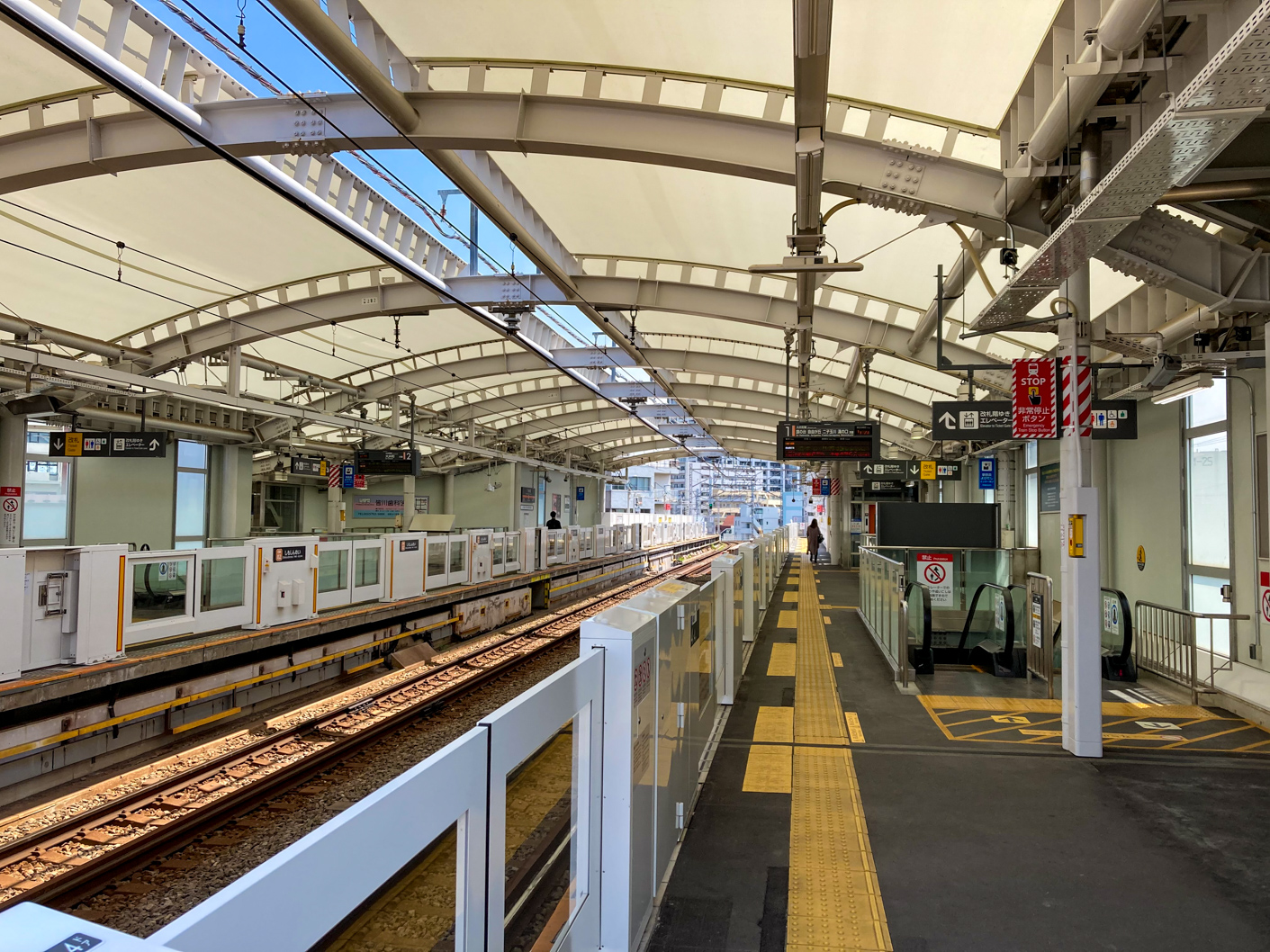
Station platforms, 2021

Shimo-Shimmei Station (下神明駅, Shimo-shinmei-eki) is a train station in eastern Tokyo, Japan.

== Station layout ==
1	■ Oimachi Line	Hatanodai ・ Ōokayama ・ Jiyūgaoka ・ Futako-Tamagawa ・(Tokyu Den-en-Toshi Line) Saginuma ・ Chūō-Rinkan
2	■ Oimachi Line	Ōimachi

== History ==
- July 6, 1927 Opened as Togoshi Station (戸越駅).
- January 1, 1936 Renamed to the present name.

== Traffic ==
In 2014, 7,434 passengers per day started or ended travel at the station in average.

== Surrounding area ==
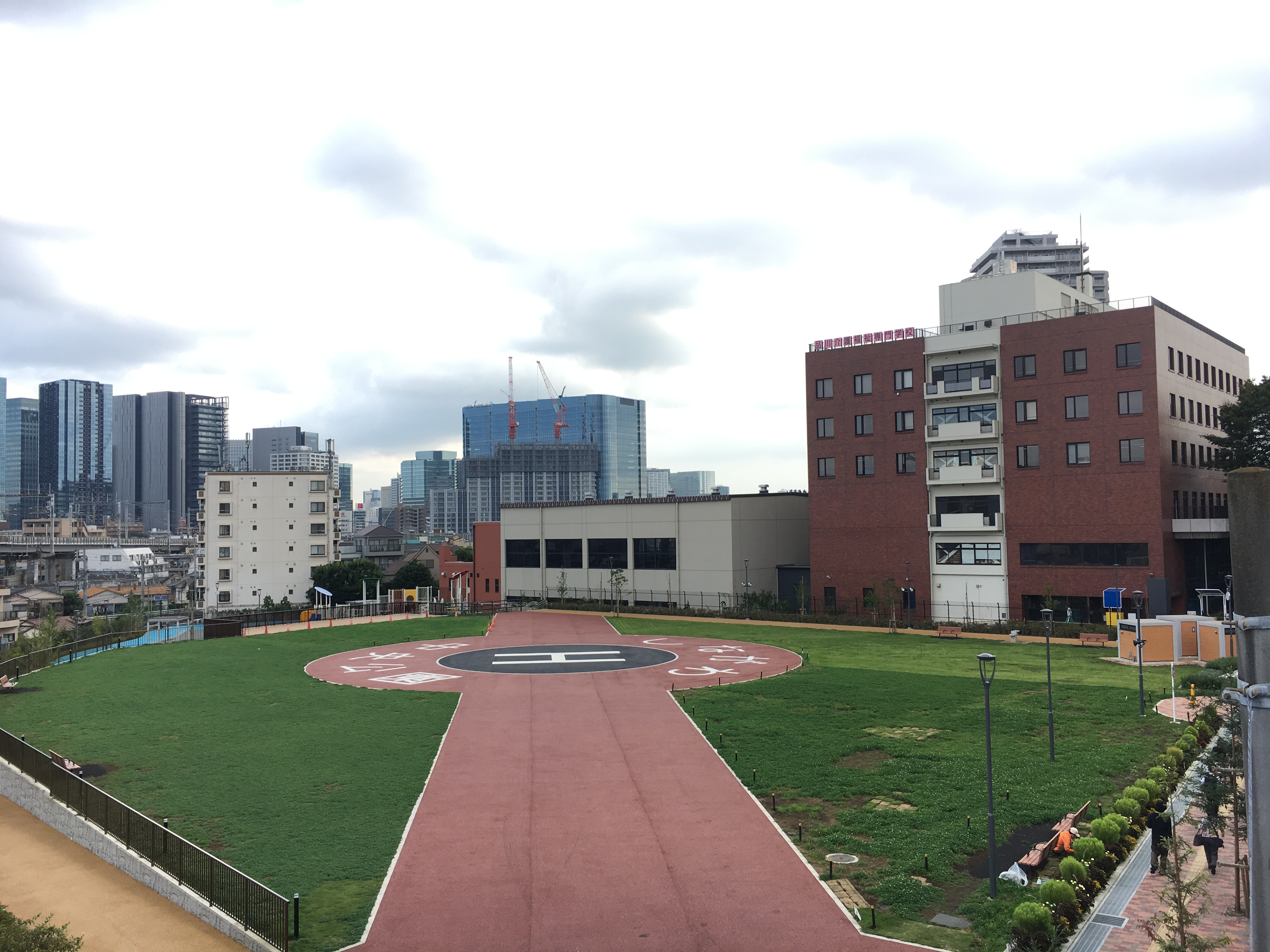
Shinagawa Chuo Park

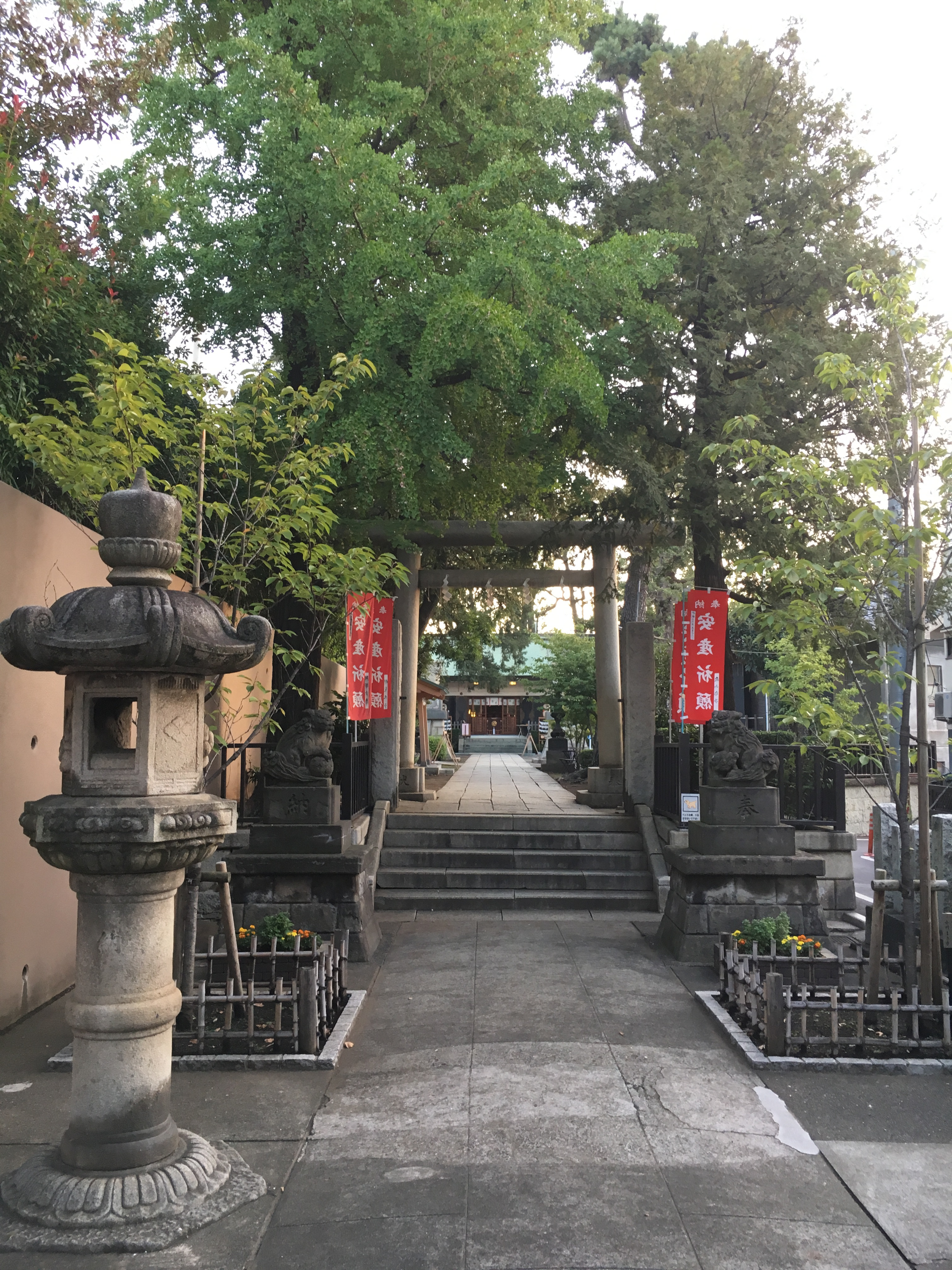
Shimo-Shimmei Tenso jinjya shrine

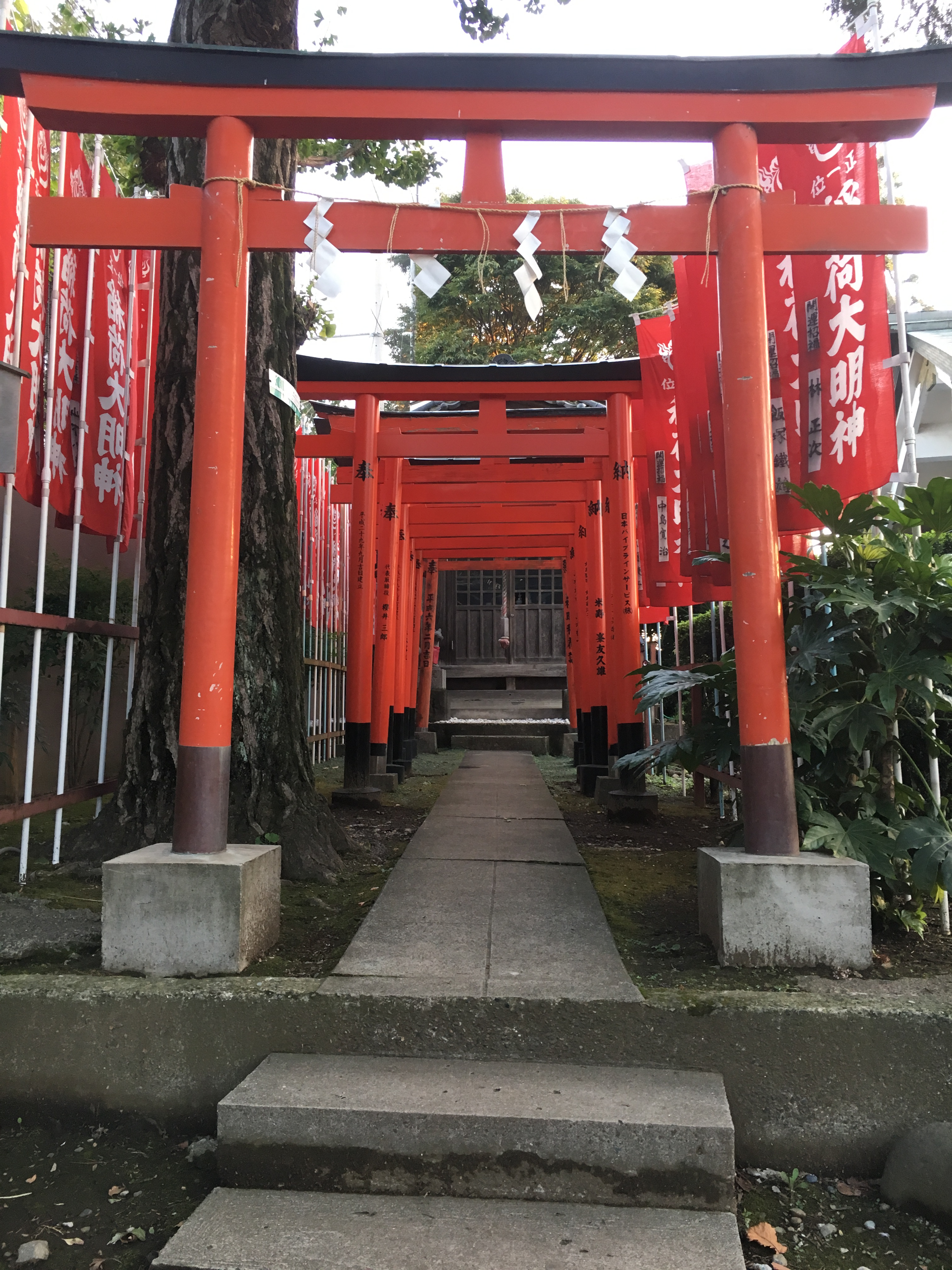
Shimo-Shimmei Tenso jinjya shrine inari

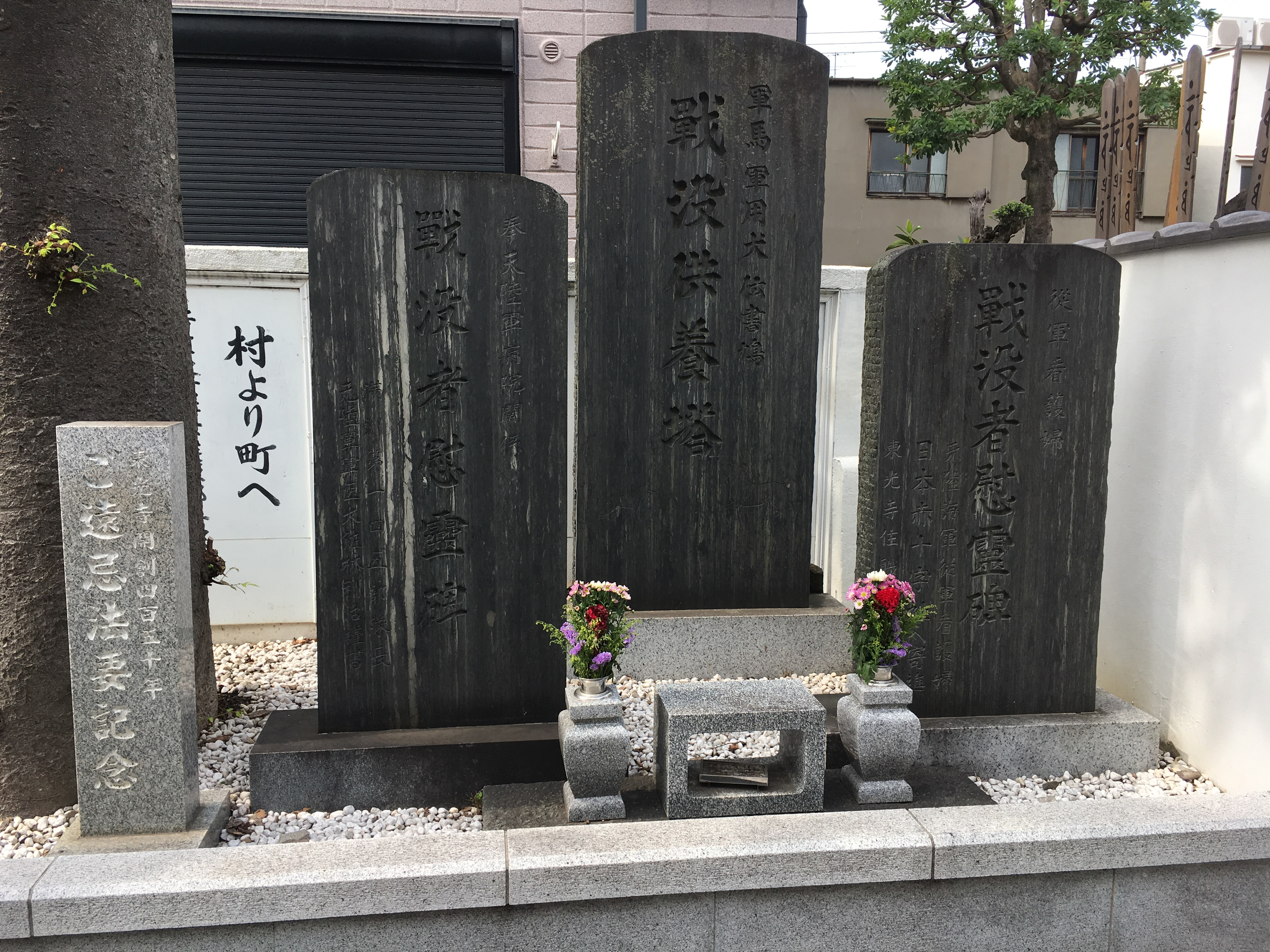
Toko-ji temple Animal memorial tower

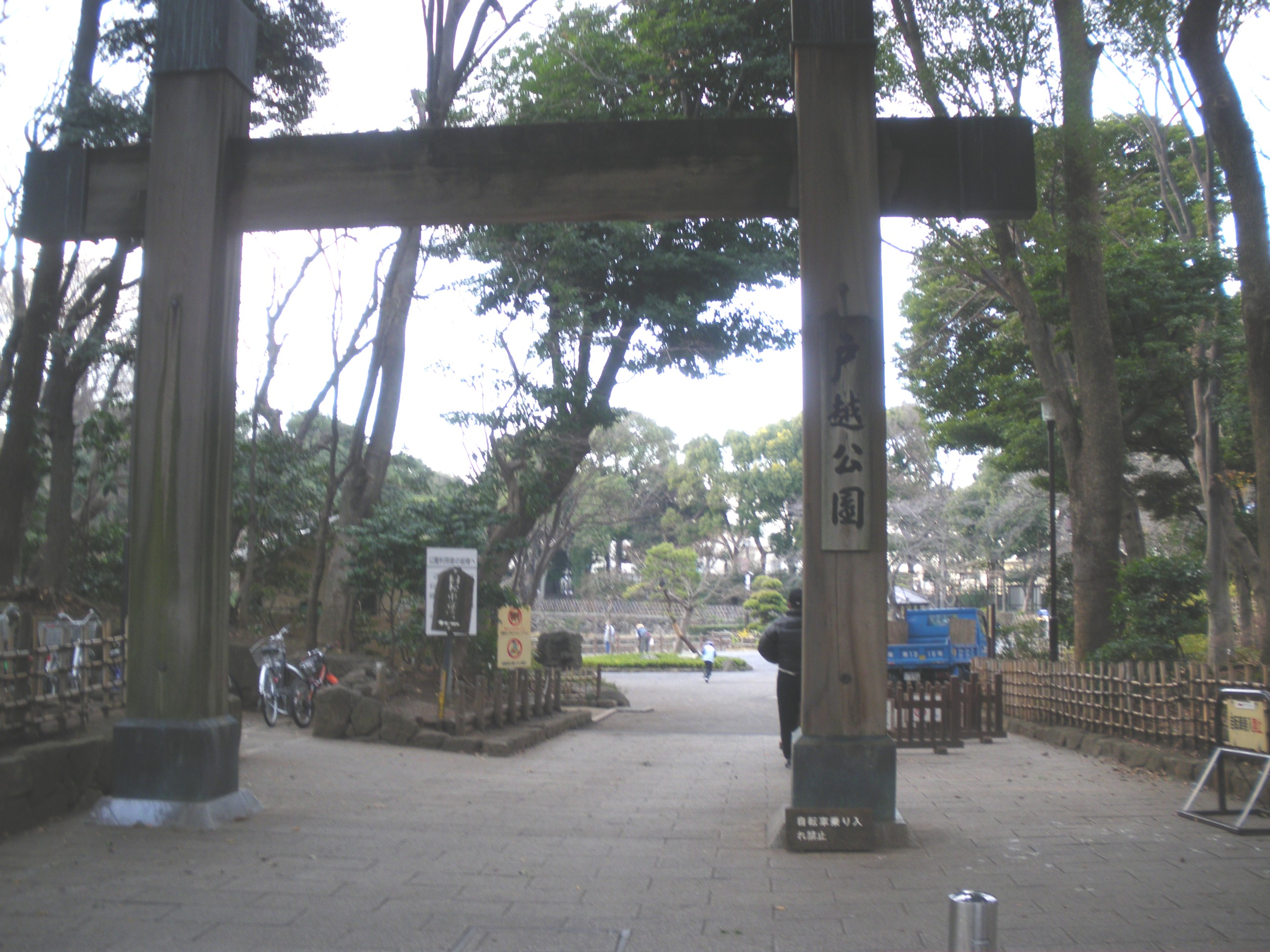
Togoshi park-Eastern gate

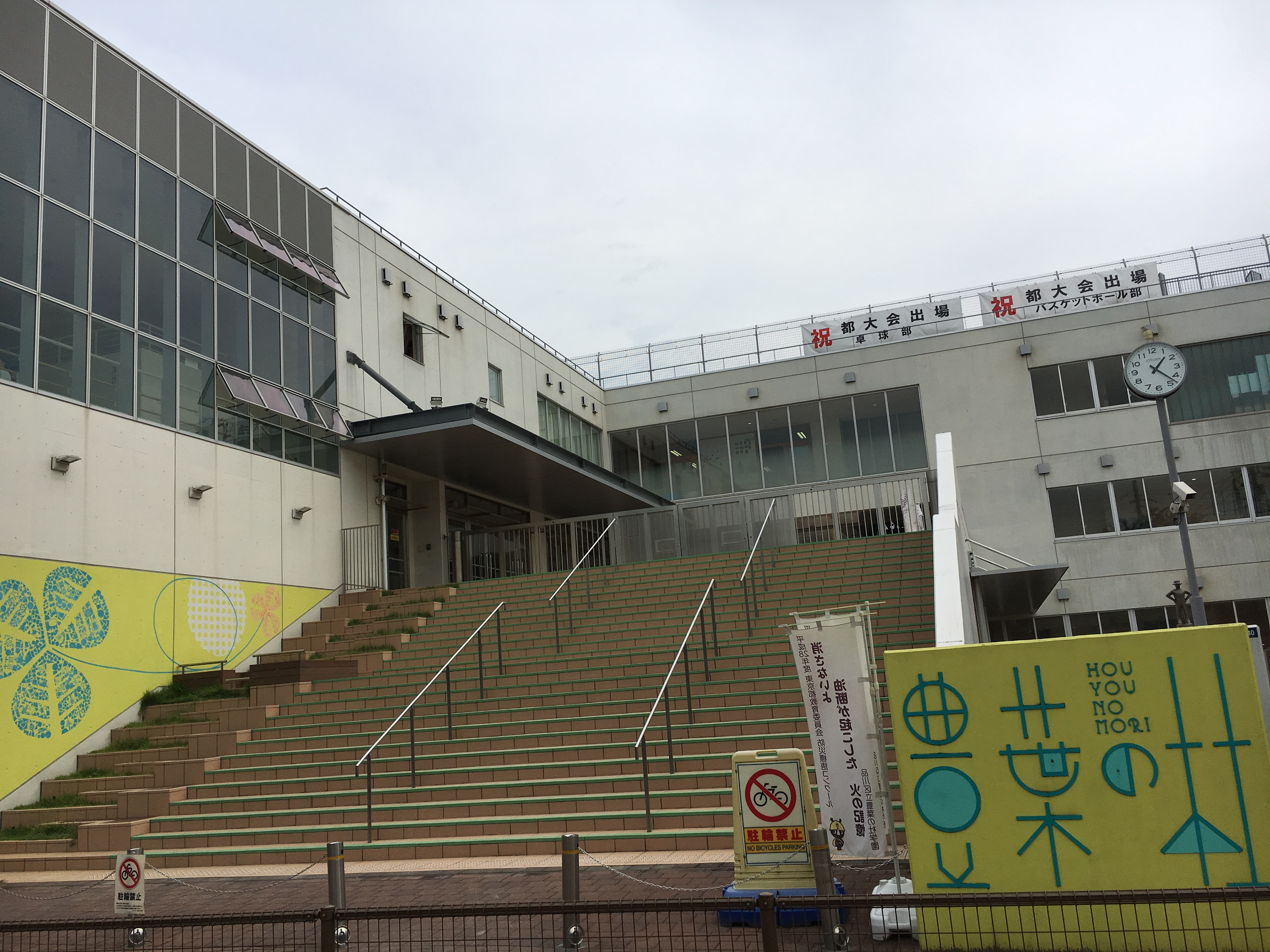
Hoyo no Mori Elementary and Junior High School
- Shinagawa Ward Office
- Shinagawa Chuo Park
- Shimoshinmei Tenso jinjya shrine
- Ebara Shichi-Fuku-Jin(Seven Lucky Gods in Ebara area)
  - Toko-ji temple
- Togoshi park
- Hoyo no Mori Elementary and Junior High School
