= Kaminoge Station =

Railway station in Tokyo, Japan

Coordinates: 35°36′43″N 139°38′19″E

Kaminoge Station 上野毛駅

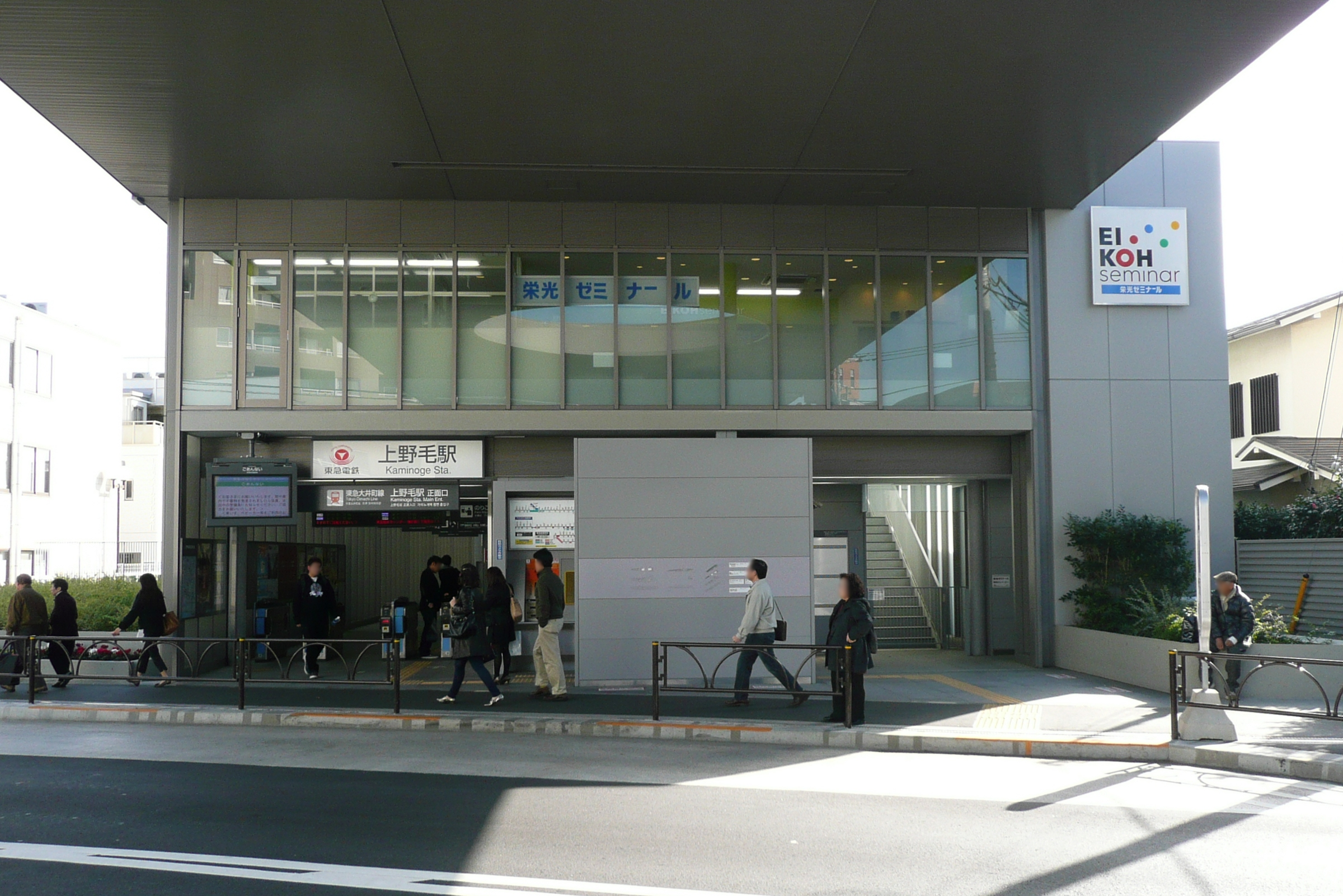
- The main station entrance, November 2011

General information
- Location: 1-26-6 Kaminoge, Setagaya, Tokyo （東京都世田谷区上野毛１丁目２６－６） Japan
- Operator: Tōkyū Railways
- Line: Ōimachi Line
- Platforms: 1 island platform
- Tracks: 3 (1 bypass)
- Connections: Bus stop

Construction
- Structure type: At grade

Other information
- Station code: OM14

History
- Opened: 1 November 1929; 96 years ago

Passengers
- FY2011: 20,830 daily

Services
Preceding station	Tōkyū Railways	Following station
Futako-tamagawa towards Mizonokuchi	Ōimachi Line Local Local	Todoroki towards Ōimachi
Location
- Location within Special wards of Tokyo Location within Tokyo Bay and Bōsō Peninsula Location within Tokyo Location within Japan

Kaminoge Station (上野毛駅, Kaminoge-eki) is a railway station on the Tokyu Oimachi Line in Setagaya, Tokyo, Japan, operated by the private railway operator Tokyu Corporation.

== Lines ==
Kaminoge Station is served by the 10.4 km Tokyu Oimachi Line from Oimachi to Futako-tamagawa, and is located 9.2 km from the starting point of the line at Oimachi. It is numbered "OM14".

== Station layout ==
The station has a single island platform below the surrounding ground level, serving two tracks, with an additional outer track to allow non-stop express trains to pass in the "up" (Oimachi) direction.

=== Platforms ===
1	■ Tokyu Oimachi Line	for Futako-tamagawa and Mizonokuchi
2	■ Tokyu Oimachi Line	Jiyūgaoka, Ōokayama, Hatanodai, and Ōimachi

== History ==
The station opened on 1 November 1929.

Kaminoge station was rebuilt, with building work completed in March 2011. The new station building was designed by the architect Tadao Ando.

== Passenger statistics ==
In fiscal 2011, the station was used by an average of 20,830 passengers daily.

== Surrounding area ==
- Tama Art University
- Gotoh Museum
- St. Mary's International School
