= Todoroki Station (Tokyo) =

Railway station in Tokyo, Japan

Coordinates: 35.6086°N 139.6480°E

Todoroki Station 等々力駅

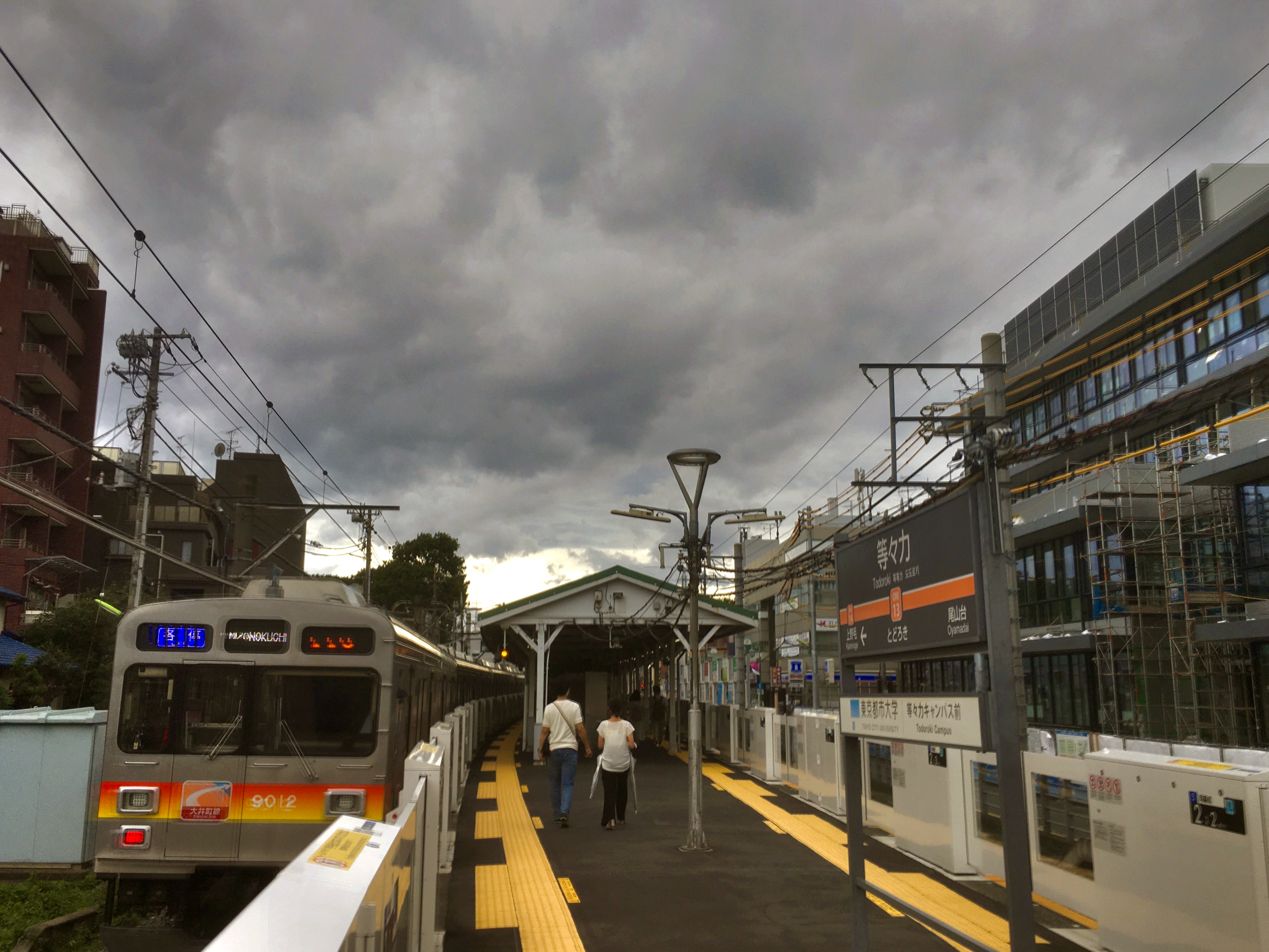
- The platforms, 2020

General information
- Location: 3-1-1 Todoroki, Setagaya, Tokyo; Japan
- Operator: Tōkyū Railways
- Line: Ōimachi Line
- Platforms: 1 island platform
- Tracks: 2
- Connections: Bus stop

Construction
- Structure type: At grade

Other information
- Station code: OM13

History
- Opened: 1 November 1929; 96 years ago

Services
Preceding station	Tōkyū Railways	Following station
Kaminoge towards Mizonokuchi	Ōimachi Line Local Local	Oyamadai towards Ōimachi
Location
- Location within Special wards of Tokyo Location within Tokyo Bay and Bōsō Peninsula Location within Tokyo Location within Japan

Todoroki Station (等々力駅, Todoroki-eki) is a railway station on the Tokyu Oimachi Line in southwest Tokyo, Japan, operated by the private railway operator Tokyu Corporation.

== Lines ==
Todoroki Station is served by the Tokyu Oimachi Line. Express services do not stop at this station.

== Station layout ==
The stations has a single ground-level island platform.

=== Platforms ===
1	■ Tokyu Oimachi Line	for Futako-Tamagawa; Tokyu Den-en-Toshi Line for Saginuma and Chūō-Rinkan
2	■ Tokyu Oimachi Line	for Jiyūgaoka, Ōokayama, Hatanodai, and Ōimachi

== History ==
The station opened on November 1, 1929.

== Surrounding area ==
- Tokyo City University
- Mangan-ji
- Todoroki Ravine
- Todoroki fudo
