= Ebaramachi Station =

Railway station in Tokyo, Japan

Coordinates: 35.6040°N 139.7077°E

Ebaramachi Station 荏原町駅

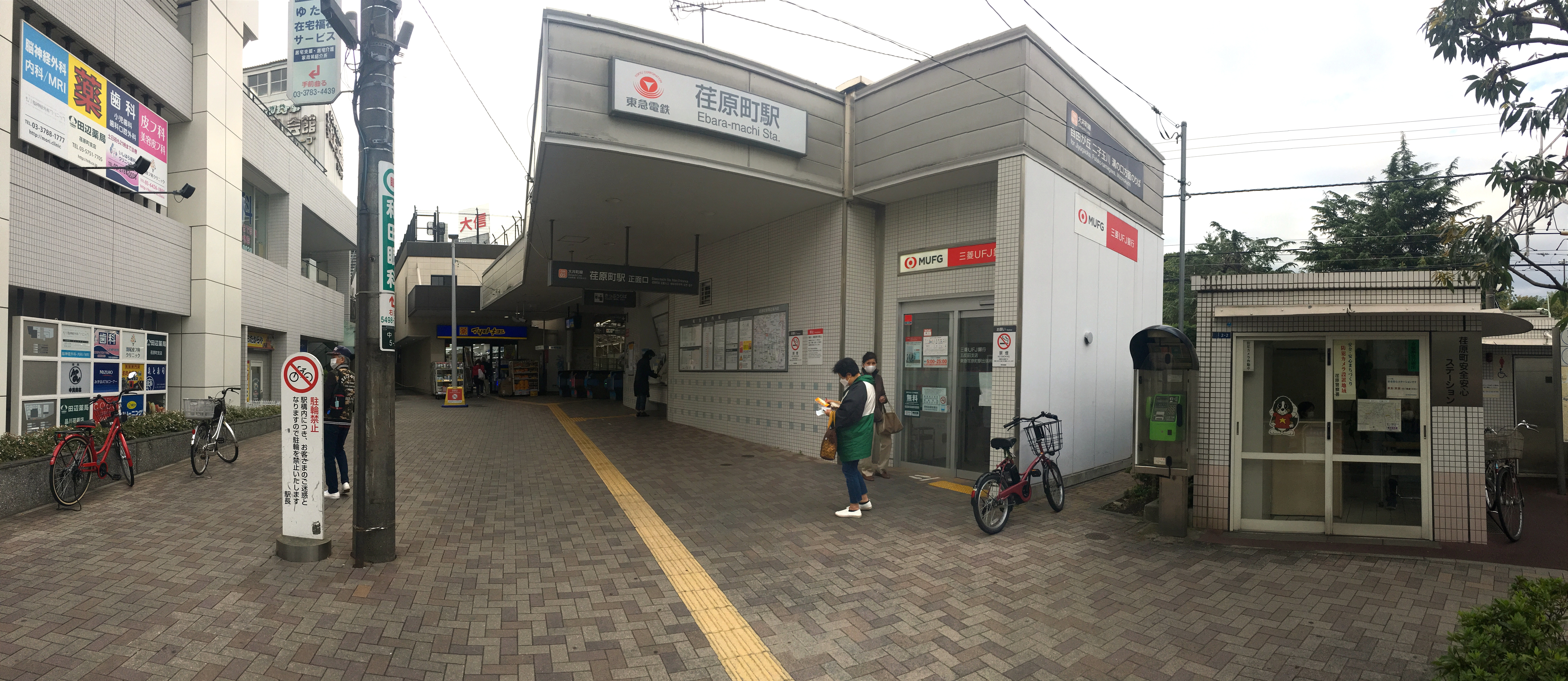
- Station exit, 2022

General information
- Location: 5-chome, Nakanobu, Shinagawa, Tokyo （東京都品川区中延５丁目） Japan
- Operator: Tokyo Kyuko Electric Railway
- Line: Ōimachi Line
- Platforms: 2 side platforms
- Tracks: 2
- Connections: Bus stop

Construction
- Structure type: At grade

Other information
- Station code: OM05

History
- Opened: 6 July 1927; 99 years ago

Services
Preceding station	Tōkyū Railways	Following station
Hatanodai towards Mizonokuchi	Ōimachi Line Local Local	Nakanobu towards Ōimachi
Location
- Location within Tokyo wards area Location within Tokyo Location within Tokyo Bay and Bōsō Peninsula Location within Japan

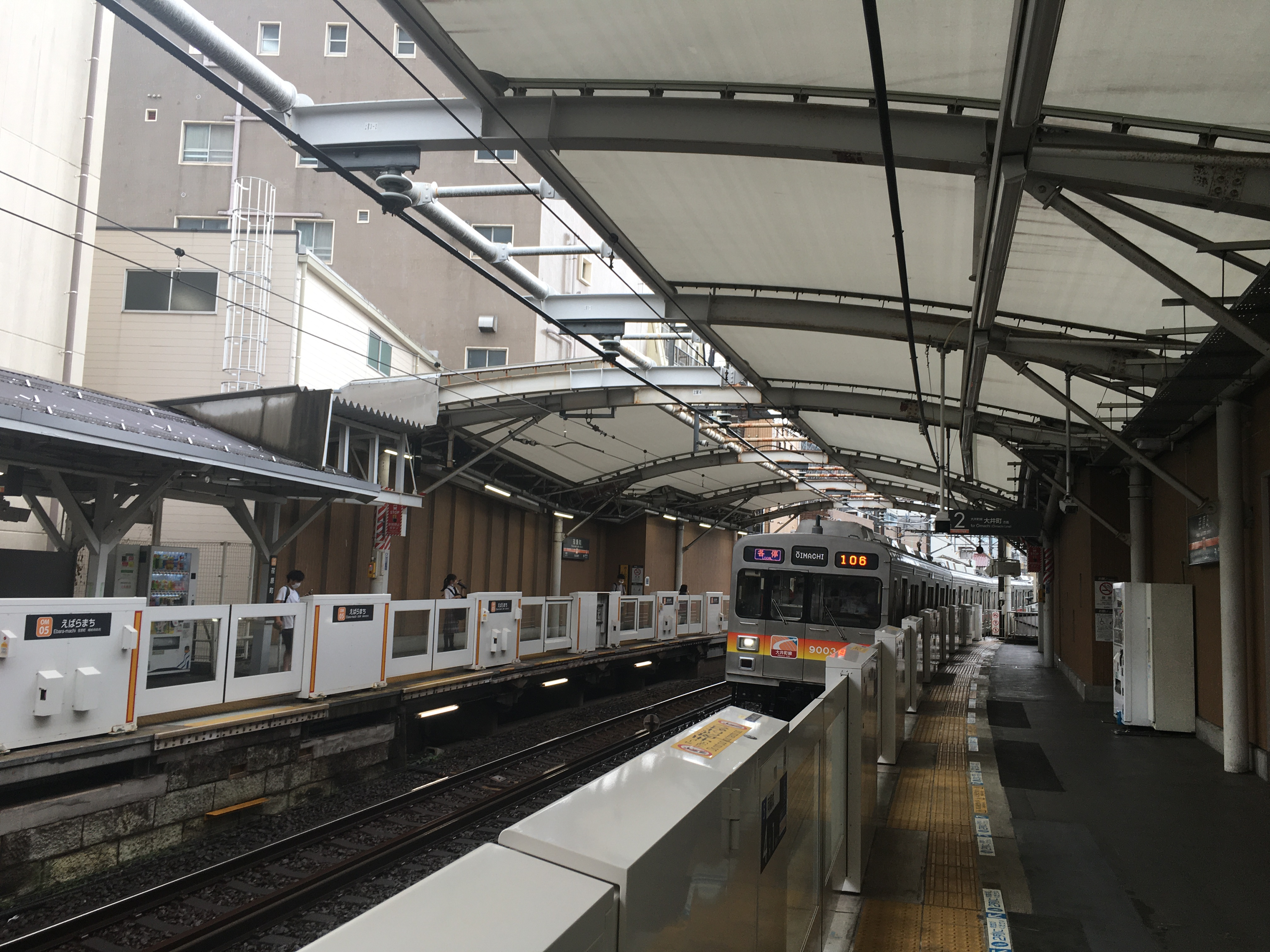
Station platforms, 2022

Ebaramachi Station (荏原町駅, Ebaramachi-eki) is a station on the Tokyo Kyuko Electric Railway Oimachi Line in southeast Tokyo, Japan.

== Station layout ==
1	■ Oimachi Line	Hatanodai ・ Ō-okayama ・ Jiyūgaoka ・ Futako-Tamagawa ・(Tokyu Den-en-Toshi Line) Saginuma ・ Chūō-Rinkan
2	■ Oimachi Line	Kamata

== History ==
- July 6, 1927 Opened.

== Bus services ==
- Ebaramachi Station Entrance (荏原町駅入口, -Iriguchi) bus stop
  - Tokyu Bus
    - <蒲15>Kamata Sta. - Ikegami Sta. - Ota Cultural Forest - Manpuku Temple mae - Ebaramachi Station Entrance
    - <森02>Omori Garage - Ota Cultural Forest - Manpuku Temple mae - Ebaramachi Station Entrance
