= Togoshi-kōen Station =

Railway station in Tokyo, Japan

Togoshi-kōen Station 戸越公園駅

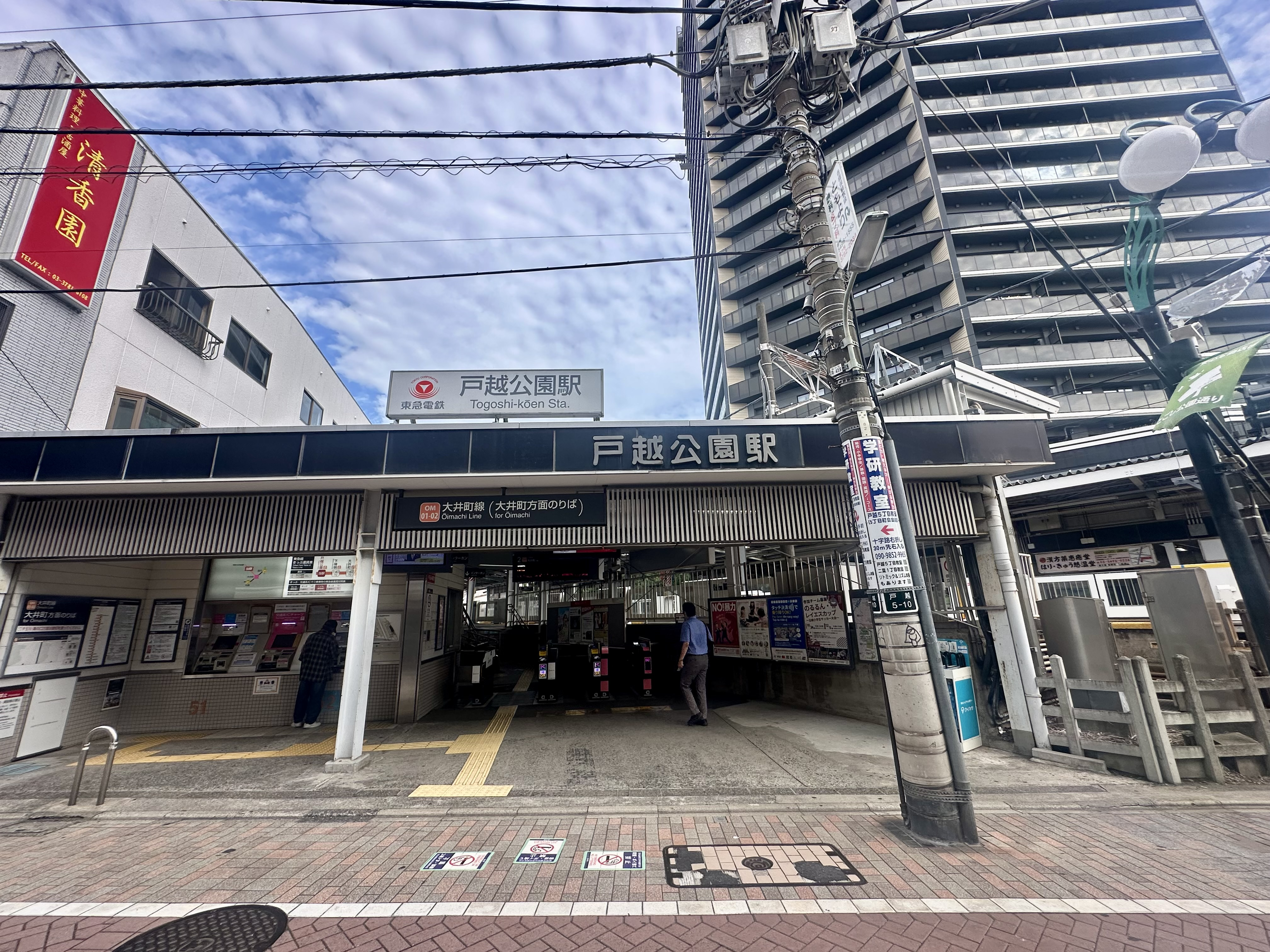

General information
- Location: 5-10-15 Togoshi, Shinagawa, Tokyo; Japan
- Coordinates: 35.6088°N 139.7179°E
- Operator: Tōkyū Railways
- Line: Ōimachi Line
- Platforms: 2 side platforms
- Tracks: 2

Construction
- Structure type: At grade

Other information
- Station code: OM03
- Website: Official website

History
- Opened: 6 July 1927; 99 years ago
- Former names: Hebikubo (until 1936)

Passengers
- FY2014: 14,102 daily

Services
Preceding station	Tōkyū Railways	Following station
Nakanobu towards Mizonokuchi	Ōimachi Line Local Local	Shimo-shimmei towards Ōimachi
Location
- Location within Special wards of Tokyo Location within Tokyo Bay and Bōsō Peninsula Location within Tokyo Location within Japan

Togoshi-kōen Station (戸越公園駅, Togoshi-kōen-eki) is a railway station on the Tokyu Oimachi Line in Shinagawa, Tokyo, Japan, operated by the private railway operator Tokyu Corporation.

== Station layout ==
The station consists of two ground-level side platforms serving two tracks. These were originally only long enough to handle three-car trains, and so the doors could not be opened on two out of the five cars on local trains that used the line. On February 24, 2013, the platforms were extended by two car lengths to enable the doors to be opened on all cars of stopping trains.

=== Platforms ===
1	■ Tokyu Oimachi Line	for Hatanodai, Jiyūgaoka, Futako-Tamagawa, Tokyu Den-en-Toshi Line for Saginuma and Chūō-Rinkan
2	■ Tokyu Oimachi Line	forŌimachi

== History ==
The station opened on July 6, 1927, as Hebikubo Station (蛇窪駅). It was renamed Togoshi-koen on January 1, 1936.

The short three-car long platforms were extended to handle five cars from February 24, 2013.

== Passenger statistics ==
In fiscal 2014, the station was used by an average of 14,102 passengers daily.

== Surrounding area ==
- Togoshi Park

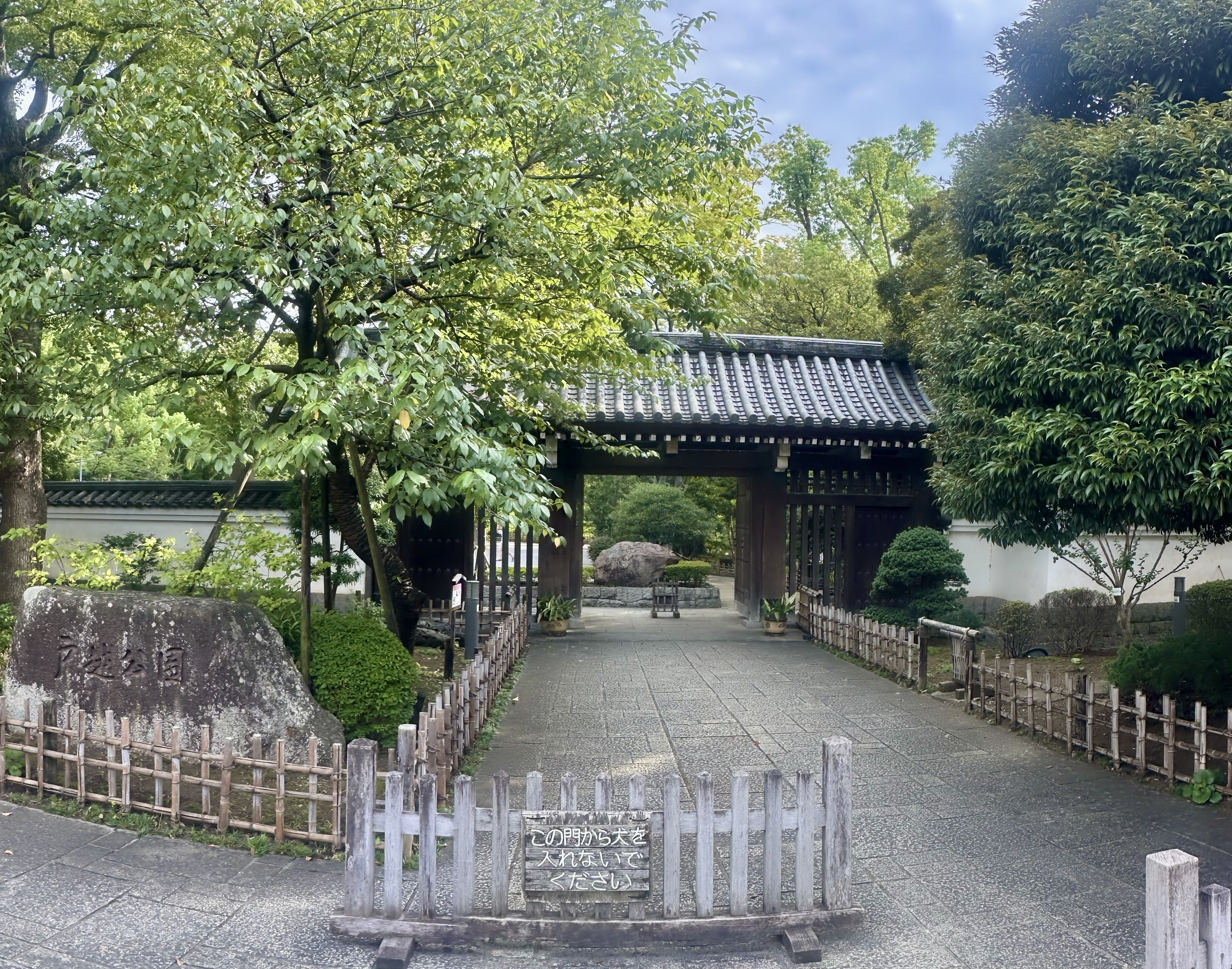
Togoshi Park entrance

== See also ==
- List of railway stations in Japan
