= Kita-senzoku Station =

Railway station in Tokyo, Japan

Coordinates: 35.6062°N 139.6935°E

Kita-senzoku Station 北千束駅

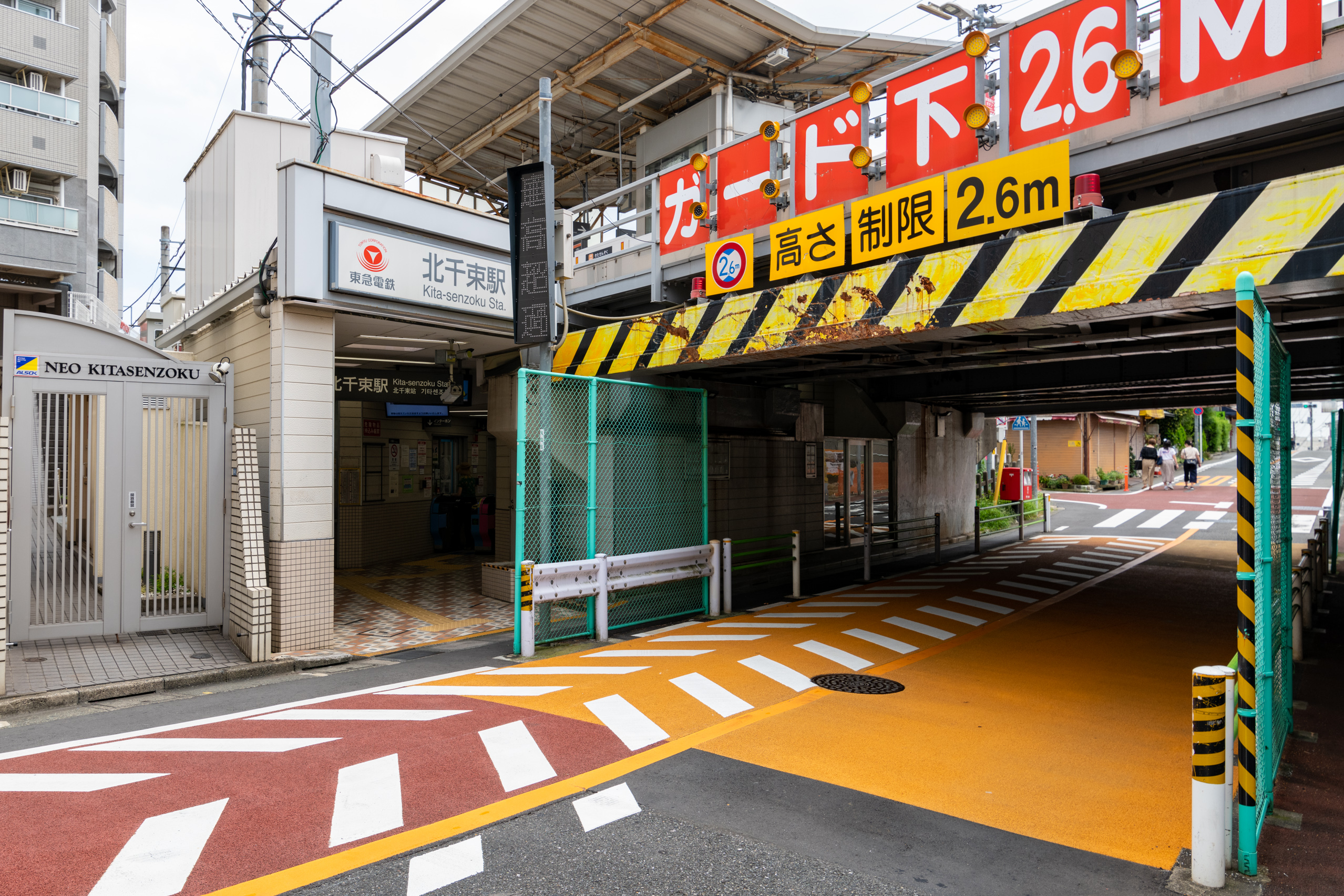

General information
- Location: 2-chome, Kita-senzoku, Ōta, Tokyo （東京都大田区北千束２丁目） Japan
- Operator: Tōkyū Railways
- Line: Ōimachi Line
- Platforms: 1 island platform
- Tracks: 2
- Connections: Bus stop

Construction
- Structure type: At grade

Other information
- Station code: OM07

History
- Opened: 10 October 1928; 97 years ago
- Former names: Senzoku-koen (until 1936)

Services
Preceding station	Tōkyū Railways	Following station
Ōokayama towards Mizonokuchi	Ōimachi Line Local Local	Hatanodai towards Ōimachi
Location
- Location within Special wards of Tokyo Location within Tokyo Bay and Bōsō Peninsula Location within Tokyo Location within Japan

Kita-senzoku Station (北千束駅, Kita-senzoku-eki) (or Kitasenchi Station) is a railway station on the Tokyu Oimachi Line in Ota, Tokyo, Japan, operated by the private railway operator Tokyu Corporation.

== Station layout ==
The station consists of a ground-level island platform serving two tracks.

1	■ Tokyu Oimachi Line	Ō-okayama ・ Jiyūgaoka ・ Futako-Tamagawa ・ Mizonokuchi
2	■ Tokyu Oimachi Line	Hatanodai ・ Ōimachi

== History ==
- November 10, 1928: Opened as Ikezuki Station (池月駅).
- May 21, 1930: Renamed Senzoku-koen Station (洗足公園駅).
- January 1, 1936: Changed its name into the present name.

== Bus services ==
- Kita-senzoku 2-chome bus stop (Tokyu Bus)
