= Kuhombutsu Station =

Railway station in Tokyo, Japan

Coordinates: 35.605567°N 139.661134°E

Kuhombutsu Station 九品仏駅

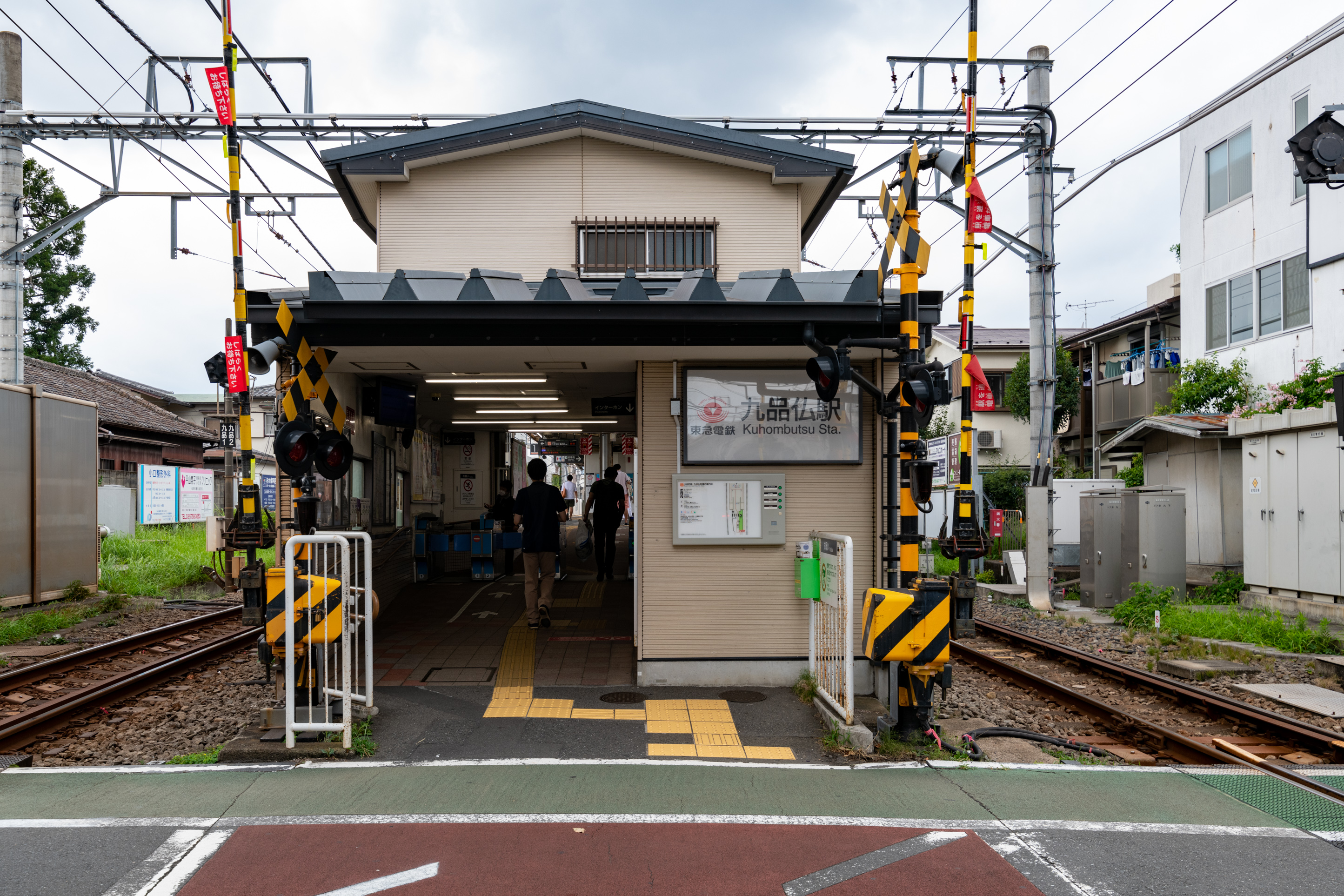

General information
- Location: 7-chome, Okusawa, Setagaya, Tokyo （東京都世田谷区奥沢7丁目） Japan
- Operator: Tōkyū Railways
- Line: Ōimachi Line
- Platforms: 1 island platform
- Tracks: 2
- Connections: Bus stop

Construction
- Structure type: At grade

Other information
- Station code: OM11

History
- Opened: 1 November 1929; 96 years ago

Services
| Preceding station | Tōkyū Railways | Following station |
|---|---|---|
| Oyamadai towards Mizonokuchi | Ōimachi Line Local Local | Jiyūgaoka towards Ōimachi |
Track layout
Location
- Location within Special wards of Tokyo Location within Tokyo Bay and Bōsō Peninsula Location within Tokyo Location within Japan

Kuhombutsu Station (九品仏駅, Kuhonbutsu-eki) is a station on the Ōimachi Line located in southeast Tokyo, Japan.

== Station layout ==
A ground-level island platform. The platform is one car-length shorter than the train, so the doors in the westernmost (Futako-Tamagawa end) car do not open. There is a short platform on the other side of the level crossing at the western end of the station, for use only by the conductors of Ōimachi-bound trains.

| 1 | ■ Oimachi Line | Futako-Tamagawa, (Tokyu Den-en-Toshi Line) Saginuma, Chūō-Rinkan |
| 2 | ■ Oimachi Line | Jiyūgaoka, Ō-okayama, Hatanodai, Ōimachi |

== History ==
- November 1, 1929 Opened.

== Bus services ==
- Kuhombutsu Sta. mae (九品仏駅前, -eki mae) bus stop
  - Tokyu Bus
    - <園02>Setagawa Ward Civilian Hall - Agricultural College - Yoga Sta. - Kuhombutsu Sta. mae - Den-en-Chofu Sta.
