= Tokyu 6000 series =

Japanese electric multiple unit train type

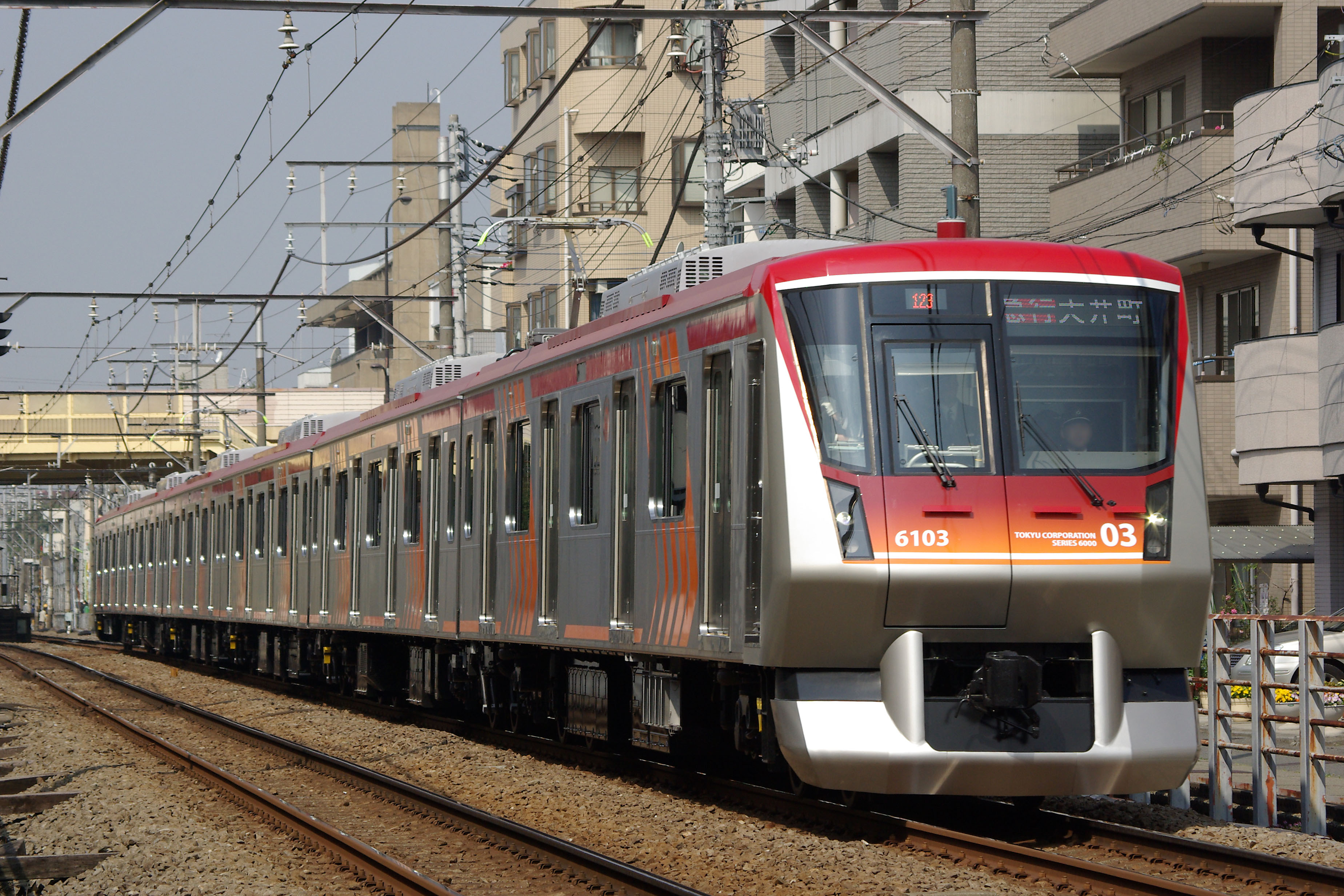
- A 6000 series set on an express service in March 2008
- Manufacturers: Tokyu Car Corporation, J-TREC
- Built at: Yokohama
- Constructed: 2007–2019
- Entered service: 28 March 2008 (18 Years)
- Number built: 44 vehicles (6 sets)
- Number in service: 42 vehicles (6 sets)
- Formation: 7 cars per trainset
- Fleet numbers: 6101–6106
- Operator: Tokyu Corporation
- Line served: Oimachi Line

Specifications
- Car body construction: Stainless steel
- Car length: 20,435 mm (67 ft 0.5 in) (end cars); 20,000 mm (65 ft 7 in) (intermediate cars)
- Width: 2,800 mm (9 ft 2 in)
- Height: 3,640 mm (11 ft 11 in)
- Doors: 4 pairs per side
- Maximum speed: Service: 110 km/h (68 mph); Design: 120 km/h (75 mph)
- Traction system: Variable frequency (2-level IGBT)
- Power output: 190 kW (250 hp) x 6
- Acceleration: 3.3 km/(h⋅s) (2.1 mph/s)
- Deceleration: 3.5 km/(h⋅s) (2.2 mph/s) (service); 4.5 km/(h⋅s) (2.8 mph/s) (emergency)
- Electric systems: 1,500 V DC (overhead line)
- Current collection: Pantograph
- Safety systems: ATC-P, CS-ATC
- Track gauge: 1,067 mm (3 ft 6 in)

The Tokyu 6000 series (東急6000系, Tōkyū 6000-kei) is an electric multiple unit (EMU) train type operated by the private railway operator Tokyu Corporation on express services on the Tokyu Oimachi Line in Japan since 28 March 2008. Based on the 5000 series design, cars have four sets of doors per side with a more aerodynamic front end design than its predecessors.

== Formation ==
As of 1 April 2017, the fleet consists of six seven-car sets, numbered 6101 to 6106 and formed as follows, with four motored (M) cars and three trailer (T) cars, and car 1 at the Oimachi end.

Car No.	1	2	3	4	5	6	7
Designation	Tc2	M	M	T	M2	M1	Tc1
Numbering	6100	6200	6300	6400	6500	6600	6700
Weight (t)	26.9	30.7	30.7	28.2	33.3	32.9	26.8
Capacity (total/seated)	139/48	150/51	150/51	150/54	150/54	150/51	139/48

Cars 2 and 3 are fitted with one pantograph, and car 5 is fitted with two pantographs.

== Interior ==
Passenger accommodation consists of longitudinal bench seating throughout, with a seat width of 460 mm (18 1/8 in) per person. Wheelchair spaces are provided at the ends of cars 2, 3, and 5.

The "Q-Seat" cars in sets 6101 and 6102 follow a similar specification to those of the 6020 series sets, featuring rotating transverse seating bays and power outlets.

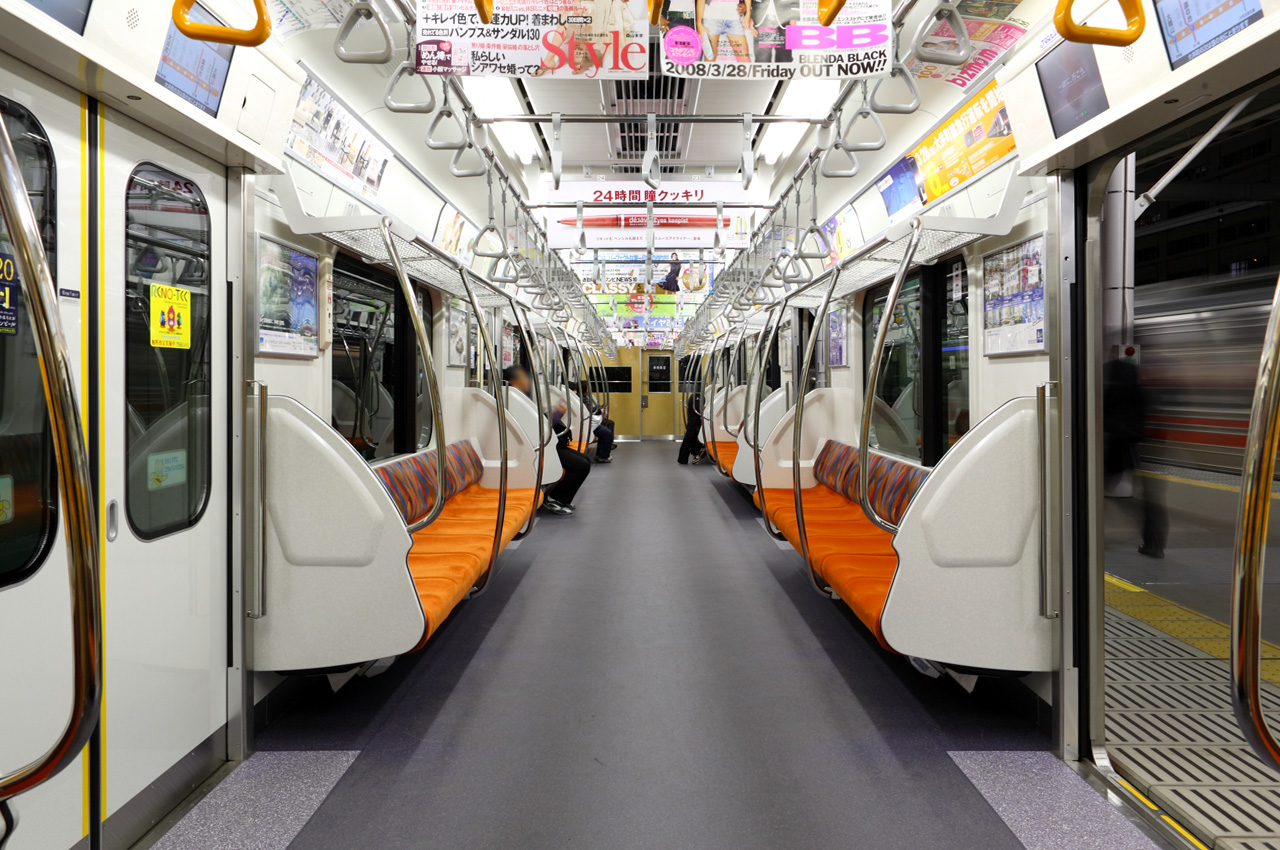
Interior view in March 2008

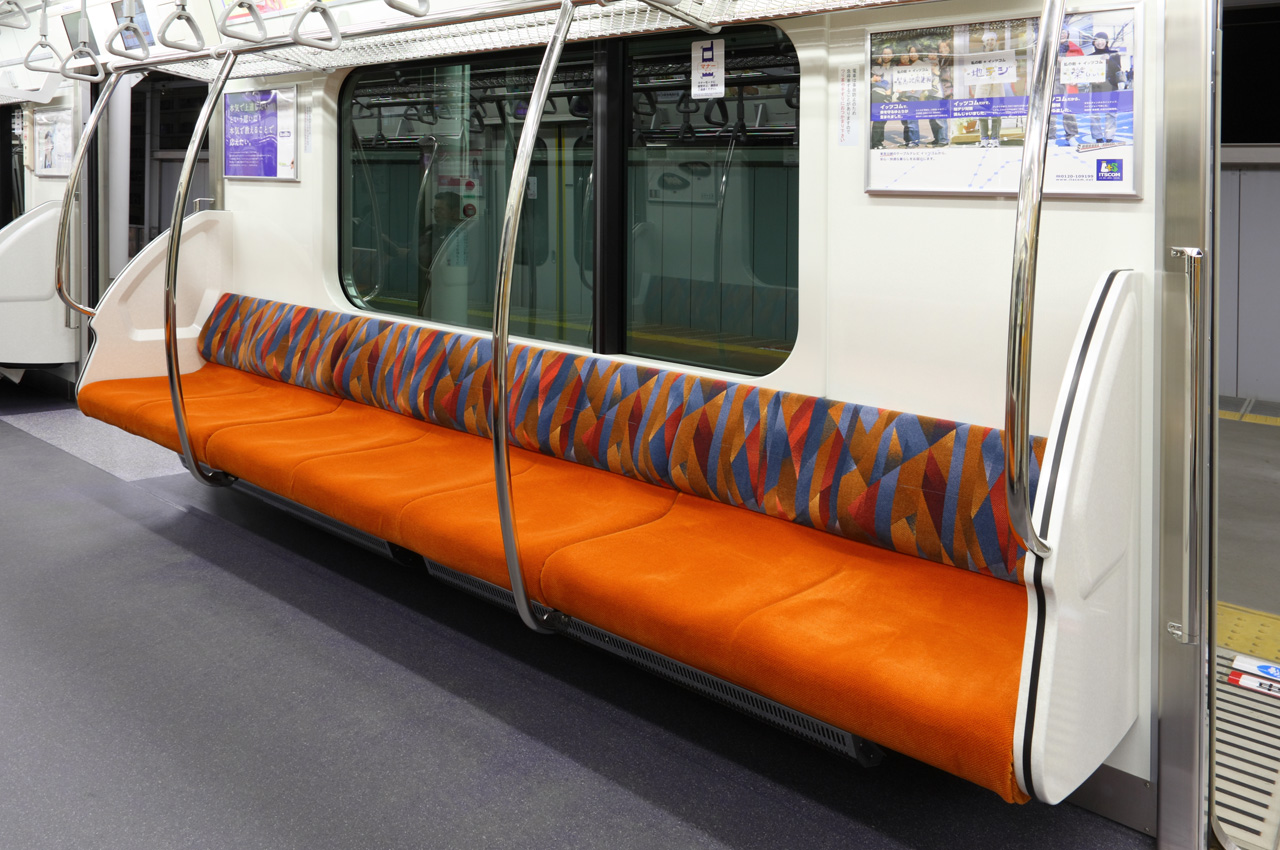
7-person longitudinal bench seat in March 2008

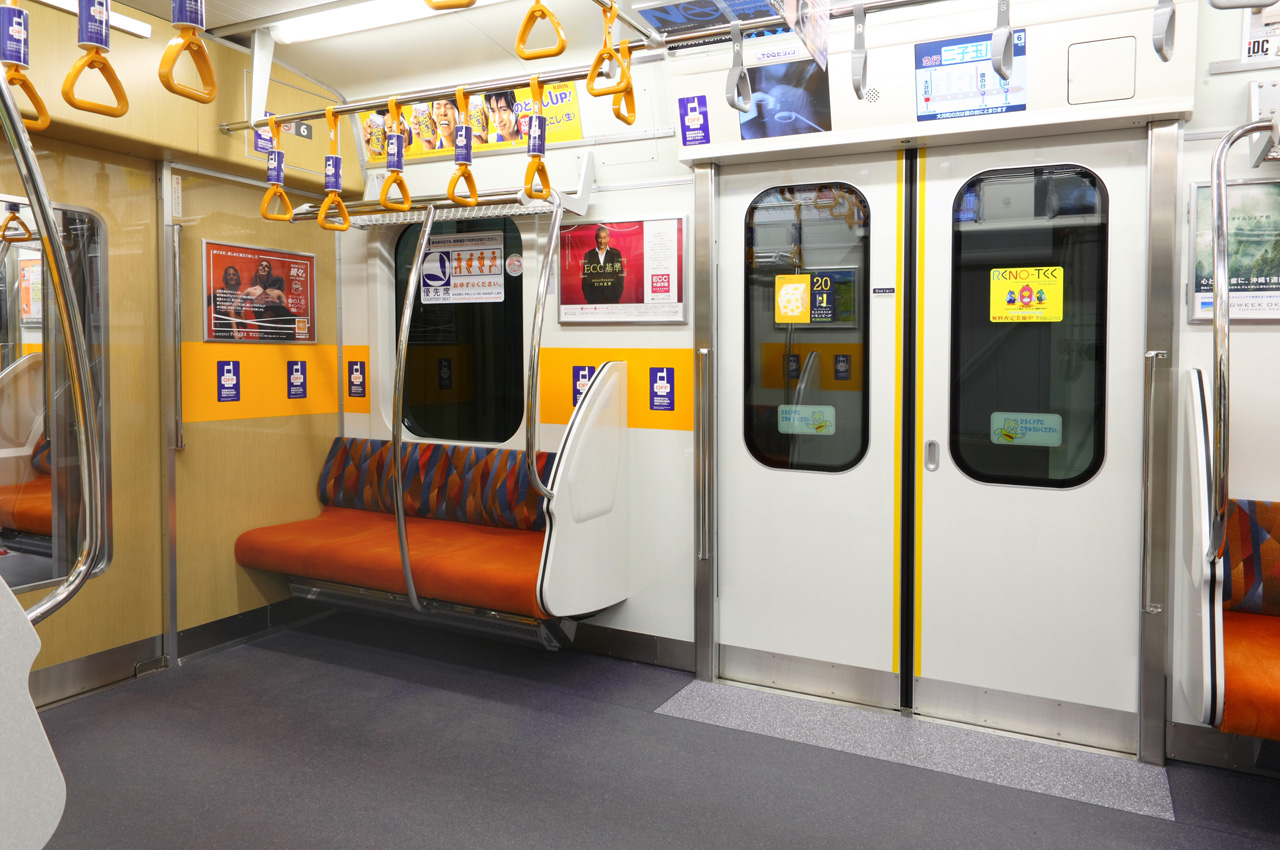
Priority seating in March 2008

== History ==
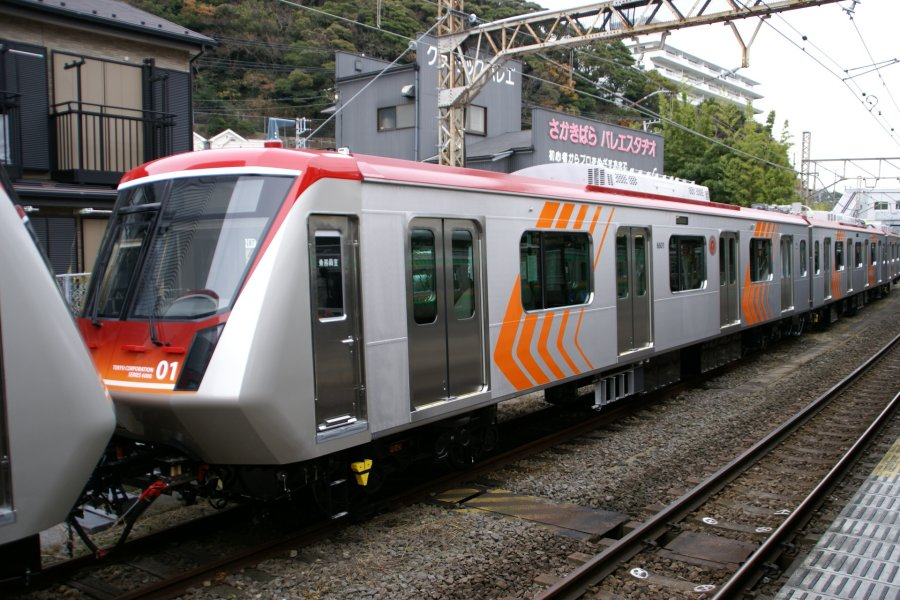
The first set, 6101, on delivery from Tokyu Car in Yokohama in December 2007

The first set, 6101, was delivered in December 2007. The first trains entered revenue-earning service on 28 March 2008.

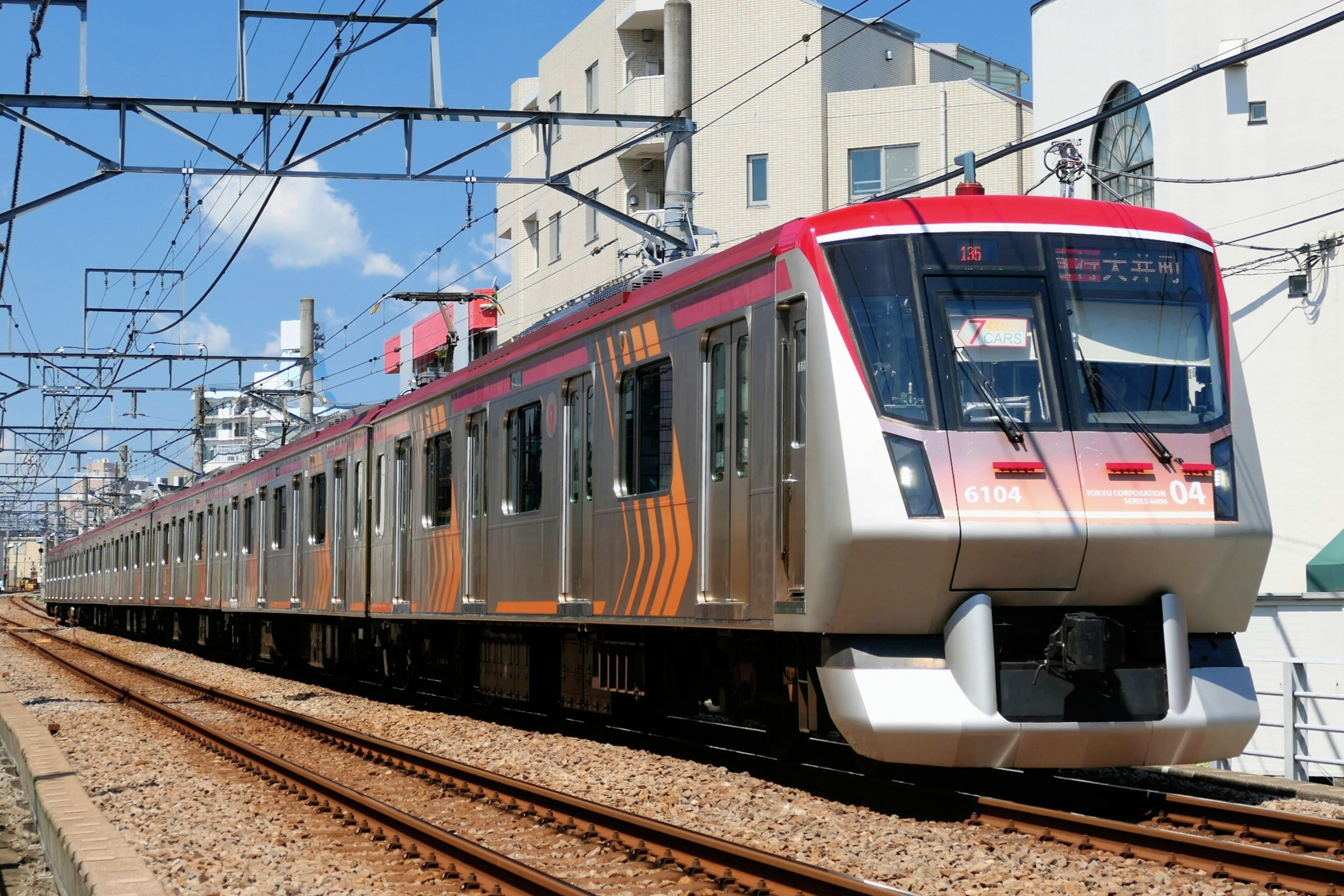
Set 6104 as a 7-car set in June 2025

Six new DeHa 6300 intermediate cars were delivered from the J-TREC factory in Yokohama in August 2017. These will be used to lengthen the fleet of six trainsets to seven cars each between November 2017 and March 2018.

Two "Q-Seat" DeHa 6300 intermediate cars were delivered in 2019; the two vehicles are numbered DeHa 6301 and DeHa 6302 and have replaced the original DeHa 6300 cars that were used to lengthen sets 6101 and 6102. The first 6000 series-operated "Q-Seat" reserved-seat service ran on 28 May 2019. The outgoing cars were stored at J-TREC's Yokohama facility until 2021, when they were repurposed to aid in lengthening the Meguro Line 5080 series sets to eight cars.
