= Ōimachi Line =

Railway line in Japan

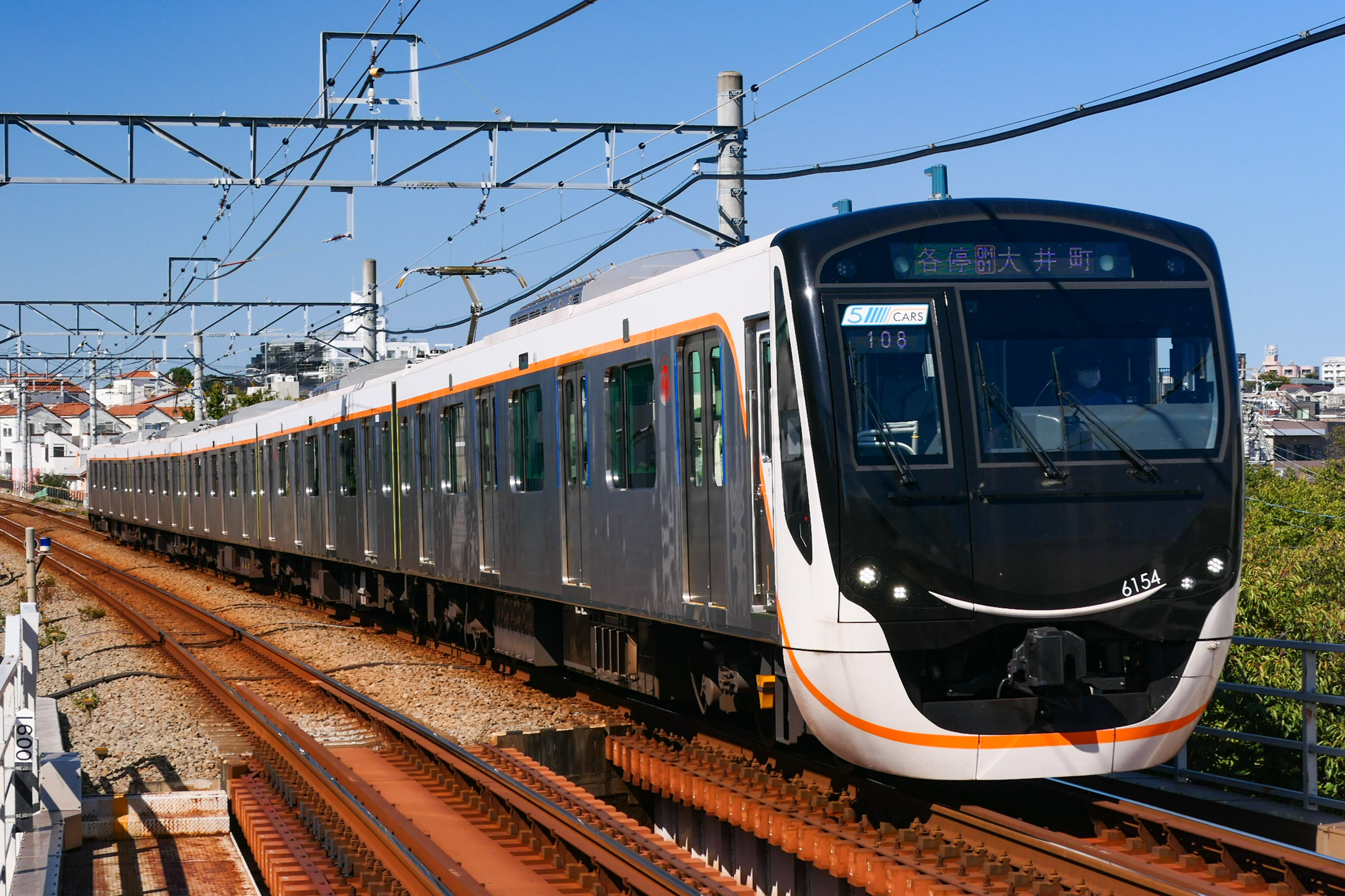
- A 6020 series EMU on an Ōimachi Line local service in October 2025

Overview
- Native name: 大井町線
- Status: In service
- Owner: Tokyu Corporation
- Line number: OM
- Locale: Tokyo and Kanagawa Prefecture
- Termini: Mizonokuchi; Ōimachi
- Stations: 16
- Color on map: Orange

Service
- Type: Heavy rail
- System: Tokyu Railways
- Operator: Tokyu Corporation
- Daily ridership: 511,214 (FY2018)

History
- Opened: 6 July 1927; 99 years ago

Technical
- Line length: 12.4 km (7.7 mi)
- Track gauge: 1,067 mm (3 ft 6 in)
- Electrification: Overhead line, 1,500 V DC
- Operating speed: 95 km/h (59 mph)

The Ōimachi Line (Japanese: 大井町線, Hepburn: Ōimachi-sen) is a railway line in Japan operated by the private railway operator Tokyu Corporation. It extends from Ōimachi in Shinagawa, Tokyo to Mizonokuchi in Kawasaki, Kanagawa.

== Stations ==
All-stations "Local" services are classified as blue and green. The latter runs on the express track between Futako-Tamagawa and Mizonokuchi and does not stop at Futako-Shinchi or Takatsu. Limited-stop "Express" services are also provided.

On weekends, two seven-car express trains per days are operated to/from Ōimachi and Nagatsuta on the Tokyu Den-en-toshi Line. Also, a few trains are operated through down to Saginuma in the late evenings. A few express trains during the holidays also serve from Chūō-Rinkan in the mornings, down in the evenings.

No.	Station	Distance in km (mi)	"Blue" local	"Green" local	Express	Transfers	Location	
OM-01	Ōimachi 大井町	0 (0)	●	●	●	Keihin–Tōhoku Line (JK19); Rinkai Line (R-07)	Shinagawa	Tokyo
OM-02	Shimo-shimmei 下神明	0.8 (0.50)	●	●	|		Shinagawa	Tokyo
OM-03	Togoshi-kōen 戸越公園	1.5 (0.93)	●	●	|		Shinagawa	Tokyo
OM-04	Nakanobu 中延	2.1 (1.3)	●	●	|	Asakusa Line (A-03)	Shinagawa	Tokyo
OM-05	Ebaramachi 荏原町	2.7 (1.7)	●	●	|		Shinagawa	Tokyo
OM-06	Hatanodai 旗の台	3.2 (2.0)	●	●	●	Ikegami Line (IK05)	Shinagawa	Tokyo
OM-07	Kita-senzoku 北千束	4.0 (2.5)	●	●	|		Ōta	Tokyo
OM-08	Ōokayama 大岡山	4.8 (3.0)	●	●	●	Meguro Line (MG06)	Meguro	Tokyo
OM-09	Midorigaoka 緑が丘	5.3 (3.3)	●	●	|		Meguro	Tokyo
OM-10	Jiyūgaoka 自由が丘	6.3 (3.9)	●	●	●	Tōyoko Line (TY07)	Meguro	Tokyo
OM-11	Kuhombutsu 九品仏	7.1 (4.4)	●	●	|		Setagaya	Tokyo
OM-12	Oyamadai 尾山台	7.8 (4.8)	●	●	|		Setagaya	Tokyo
OM-13	Todoroki 等々力	8.3 (5.2)	●	●	|		Setagaya	Tokyo
OM-14	Kaminoge 上野毛	9.2 (5.7)	●	●	|		Setagaya	Tokyo
OM-15	Futako-tamagawa 二子玉川	10.4 (6.5)	●	●	●	Den-en-toshi Line (DT07)	Setagaya	Tokyo
DT-08	Futako-shinchi 二子新地	11.1 (6.9)	●	|	|	Den-en-toshi Line (DT08)	Takatsu-ku, Kawasaki	Kanagawa
DT-09	Takatsu 高津	11.7 (7.3)	●	|	|	Den-en-toshi Line (DT09)	Takatsu-ku, Kawasaki	Kanagawa
OM-16	Mizonokuchi 溝の口	12.4 (7.7)	●	●	●	Den-en-toshi Line (DT10; limited through service); Nambu Line (Musashi-Mizonokuchi: JN10)	Takatsu-ku, Kawasaki	Kanagawa
↓ Limited through-running via the Den-en-toshi Line: "Blue" Local trains to/from Saginuma and Express trains to/from Nagatsuta and Chūō-rinkan ↓

== Rolling stock ==
=== Local services ===
- 6020 series five-car EMUs (from July 2025)
- 9000 series five-car EMUs
- 9020 series five-car EMUs
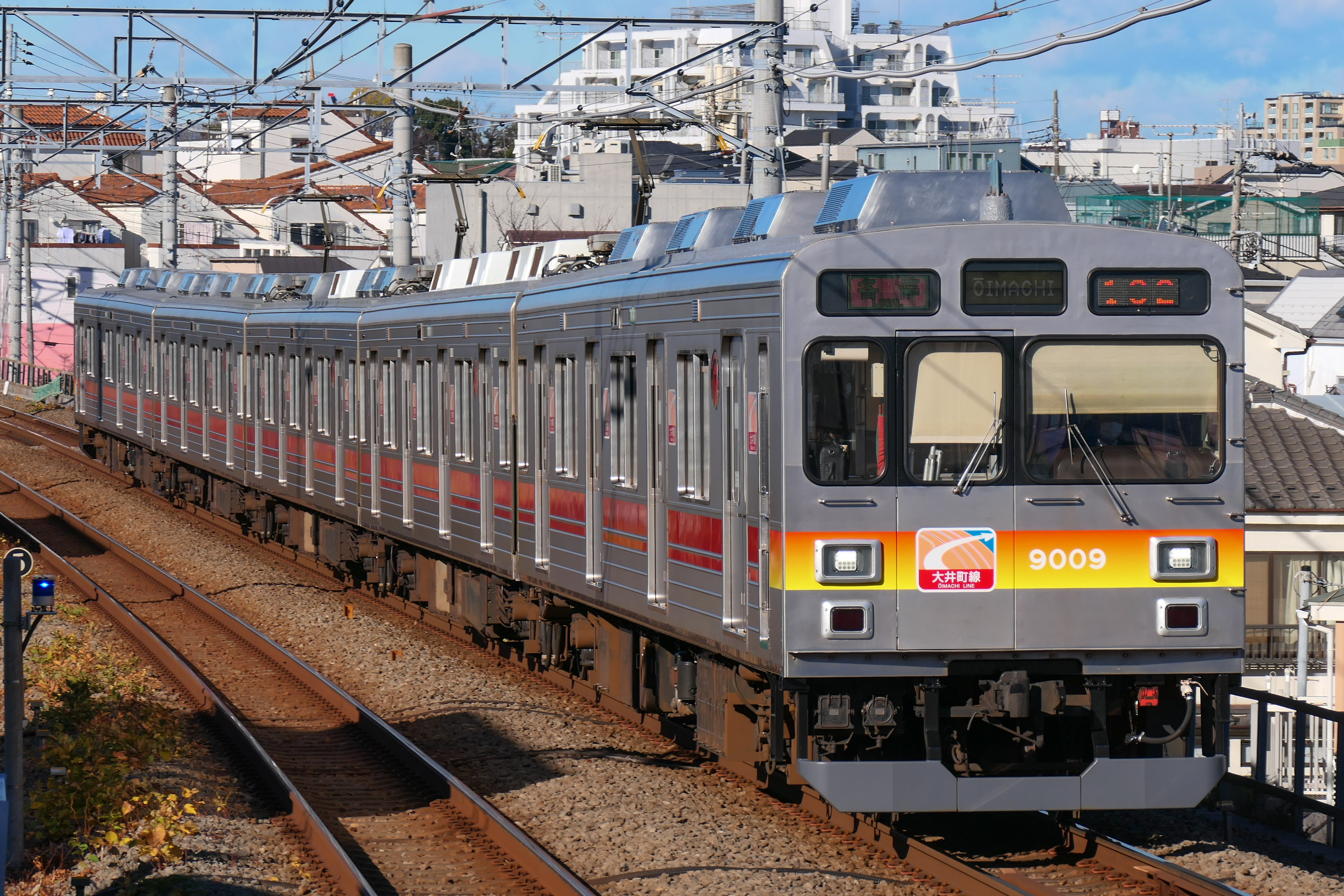
A 9000 series EMU in December 2021

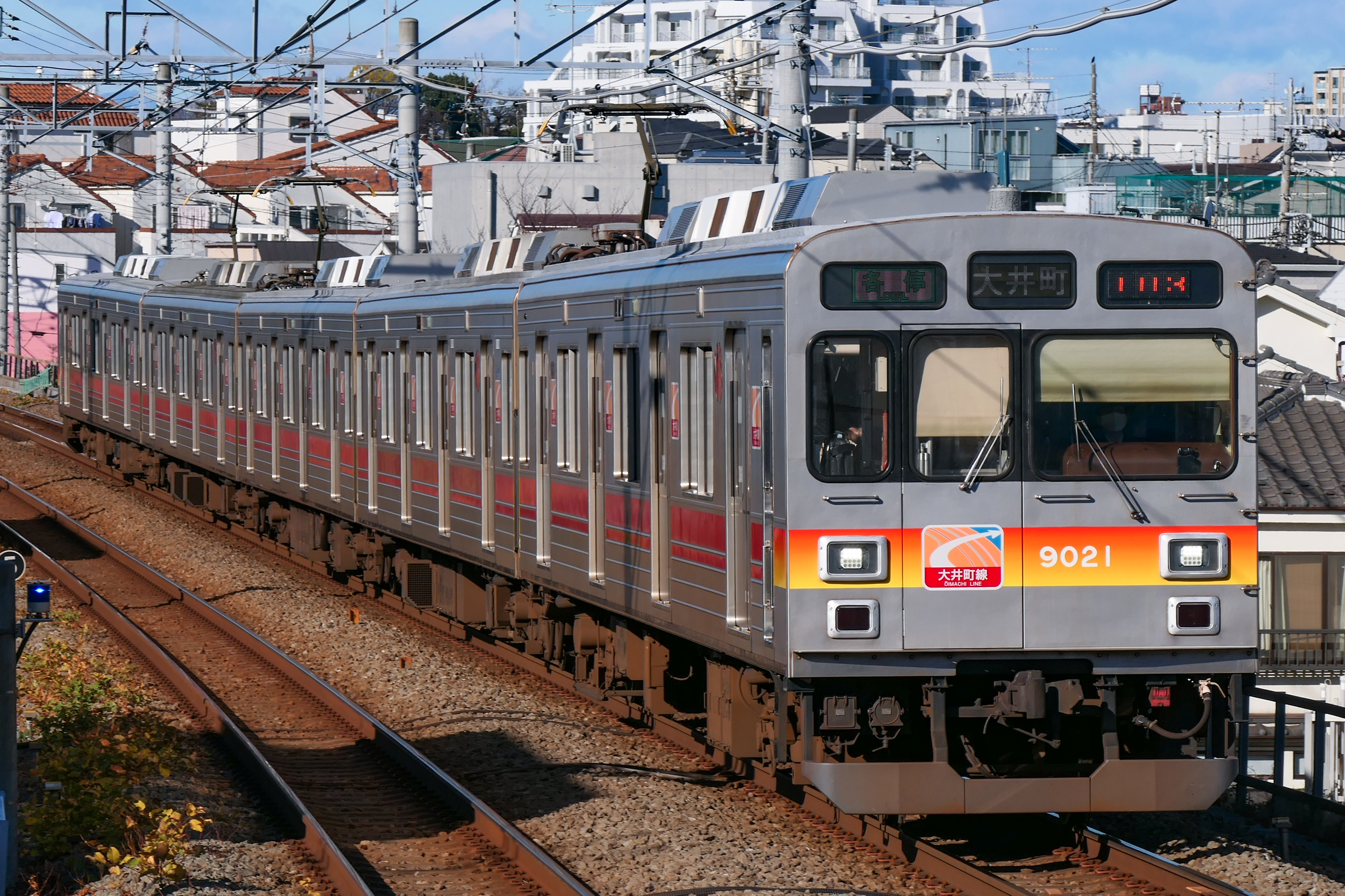
A 9020 series EMU in December 2021

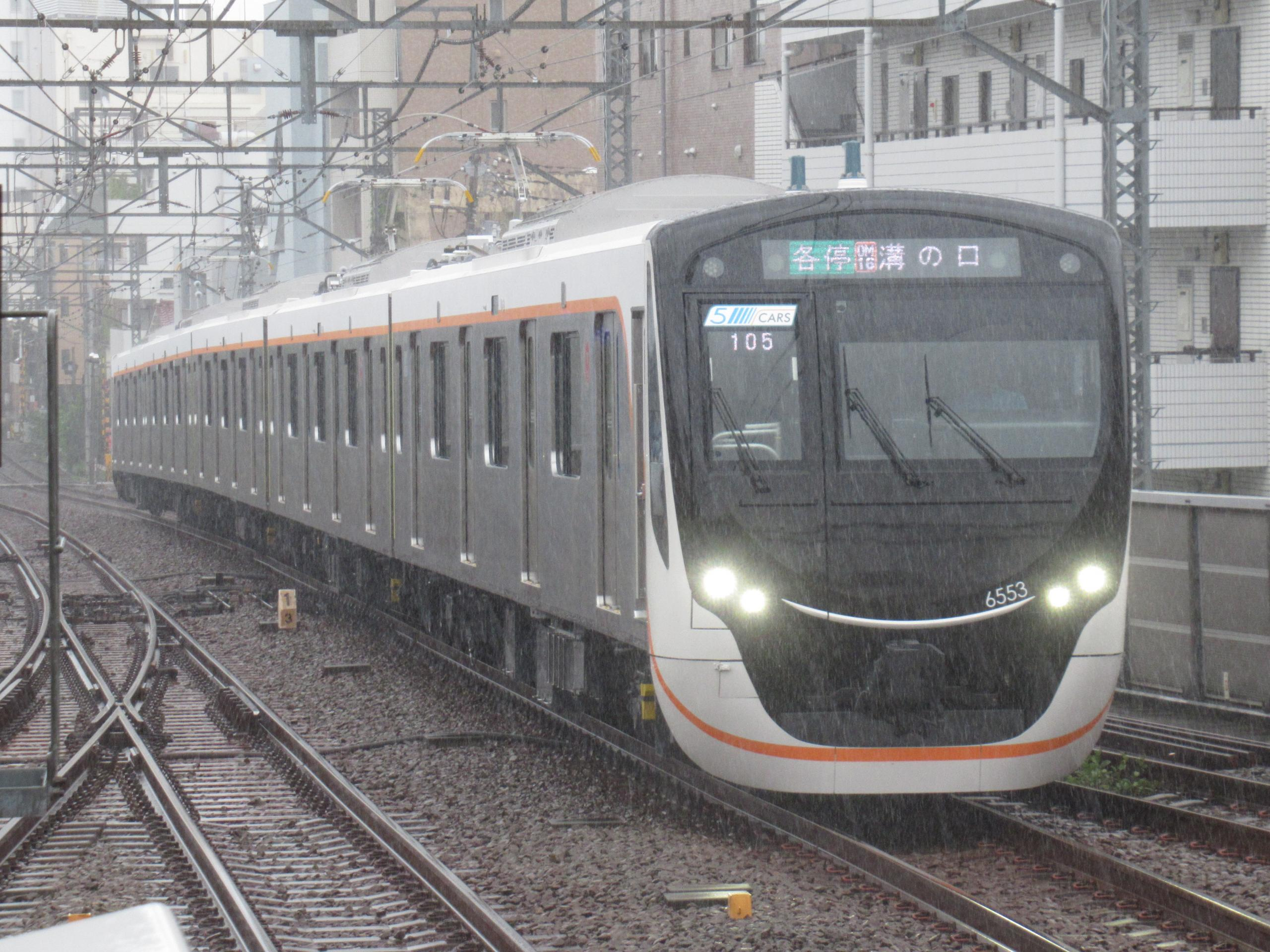
A 5-car 6020 series EMU in August 2025

=== Express services ===
- 6000 series seven-car EMUs (since March 2008, originally delivered as six-car sets)
- 6020 series seven-car EMUs (from March 2018)
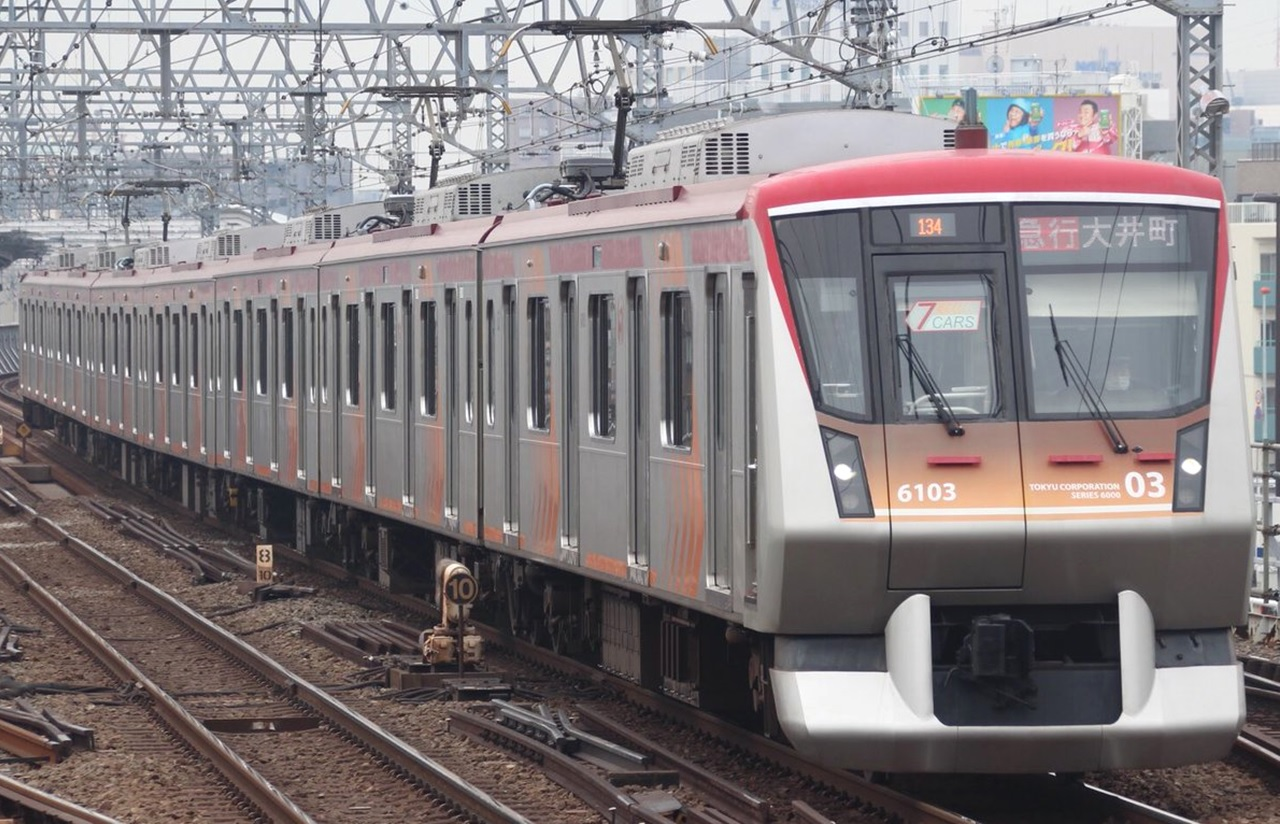
A 6000 series EMU in March 2018

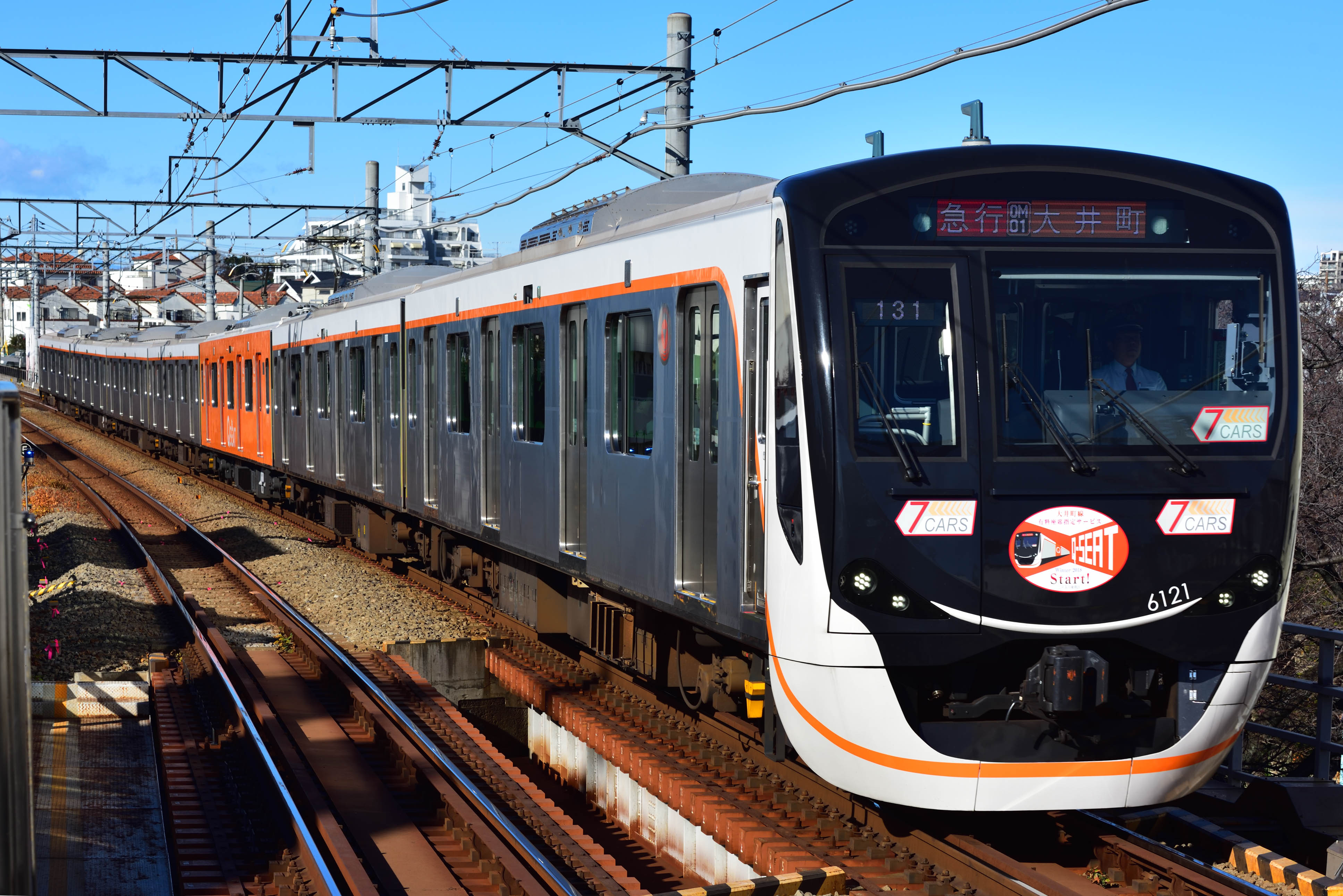
A 6020 series EMU in December 2018

=== Former rolling stock ===
- 8000 series
- 8090 series
- 8590 series
- 8500 series

== History ==
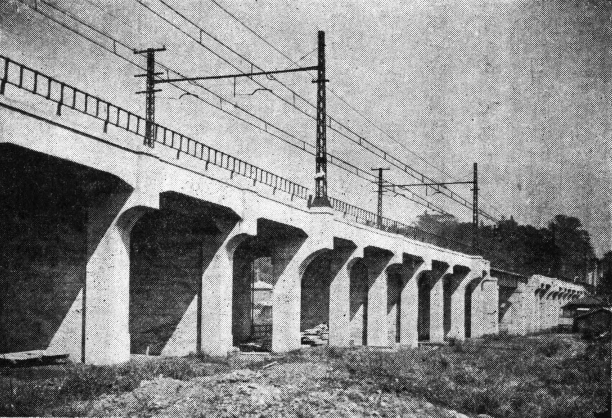
The elevated section of the line in the 1940s.

- 6 July 1927: The section between Ōimachi and Ōokayama was opened by the Mekama Electric Railway (目黒蒲田電鉄).
- 1 November 1929: The section between Jiyūgaoka and Futako-tamagawa was opened by the Mekama Electric Railway.
- 25 December 1929: The section between Ōokayama and Jiyūgaoka was opened by Mekama Electric Railway.
- 29 June 1938: The Mekama Railway was absorbed into the Toyoko Electric Railway (東京横浜電鉄).
- 15 January 1958: Electric supply was raised to 1,500 V DC.
- 11 October 1963: The line was renamed the Den-en-toshi Line, together with the section south of Futako-tamagawa.
- 16 November 1977: Through running started between Shibuya and Nagatsuta.
- 12 August 1979: The line was renamed the Ōimachi Line and separated from the Den-en-toshi Line south of Futako-tamagawa.
- 23 February 2008: ATS was replaced by ATC.
- 28 March 2008: Express services started.
- 11 July 2009: The Ōimachi Line was extended to Mizonokuchi from Futako-tamagawa.

Express services on the line were lengthened from six to seven cars in late fiscal 2017, and the platforms at Ōimachi, Hatanodai, and Jiyūgaoka were lengthened to handle the longer trains. Since December 2018, "Q Seat" reserved seating has been implemented on some express services that run between Ōimachi and Nagatsuta stations.
