= Midorigaoka Station (Tokyo) =

Railway station in Tokyo, Japan

Coordinates: 35°36′23″N 139°40′45″E

Midorigaoka Station 緑が丘駅

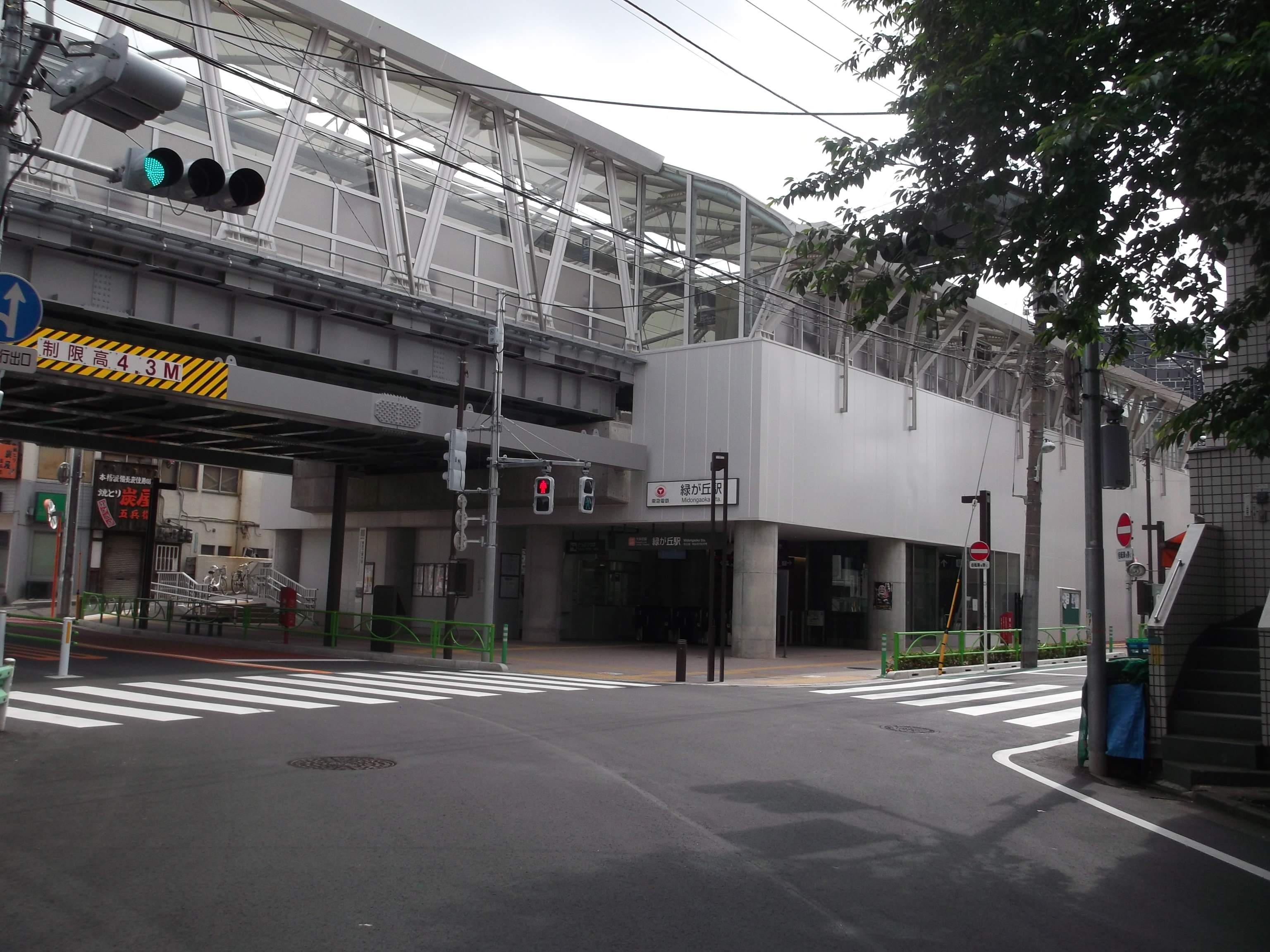

General information
- Location: 3-1-12 Midorigaoka, Meguro, Tokyo; Japan
- Operator: Tōkyū Railways
- Line: Ōimachi Line
- Platforms: 2 side platforms
- Tracks: 2
- Connections: Bus stop

Construction
- Structure type: Elevated

Other information
- Station code: OM09

History
- Opened: 25 December 1929; 96 years ago
- Former names: Nakamaruyama (until 1966)

Services
Preceding station	Tōkyū Railways	Following station
Jiyūgaoka towards Mizonokuchi	Ōimachi Line Local Local	Ōokayama towards Ōimachi
Location
- Location within Special wards of Tokyo Location within Tokyo Bay and Bōsō Peninsula Location within Tokyo Location within Japan

Midorigaoka Station (緑が丘駅, Midorigaoka-eki) is a station located on the Tokyu Oimachi Line in a residential neighborhood of Meguro in southwest Tokyo, Japan.

== Station layout ==
Two elevated side platforms.

1	■ Oimachi Line	Jiyūgaoka, Futako-Tamagawa, Mizonokuchi (Den-en-Toshi Line) Saginuma, Chūō-Rinkan
2	■ Oimachi Line	Ōokayama, Hatanodai, Ōimachi

== History ==
On December 25, 1929, the station opened as Nakamaruyama Station. On April 1, 1933, the station name was changed into Midorigaoka Station (緑ヶ丘駅). On January 20, 1966, the station name in Japanese script was changed into the present name. Romanized name did not change.

== Bus service ==
- Midorigaoka Station (緑ヶ丘駅, Midorigaoka-eki) bus stop
  - Tokyu Bus
    - <渋33>Shibuya Sta. - Toritsudaigaku Sta. - Midorigaoka Sta. - Yukigaya - Tamagawa Sta.
    - <多摩01>Tamagawa Sta. - Yukigaya - Midorigaoka Sta. - Toritsudaigaku Sta. - Tokyo Medical Center
