= Ōokayama Station =

Railway station in Tokyo, Japan

Coordinates: 35°36′26″N 139°41′08″E

Ōokayama Station 大岡山駅

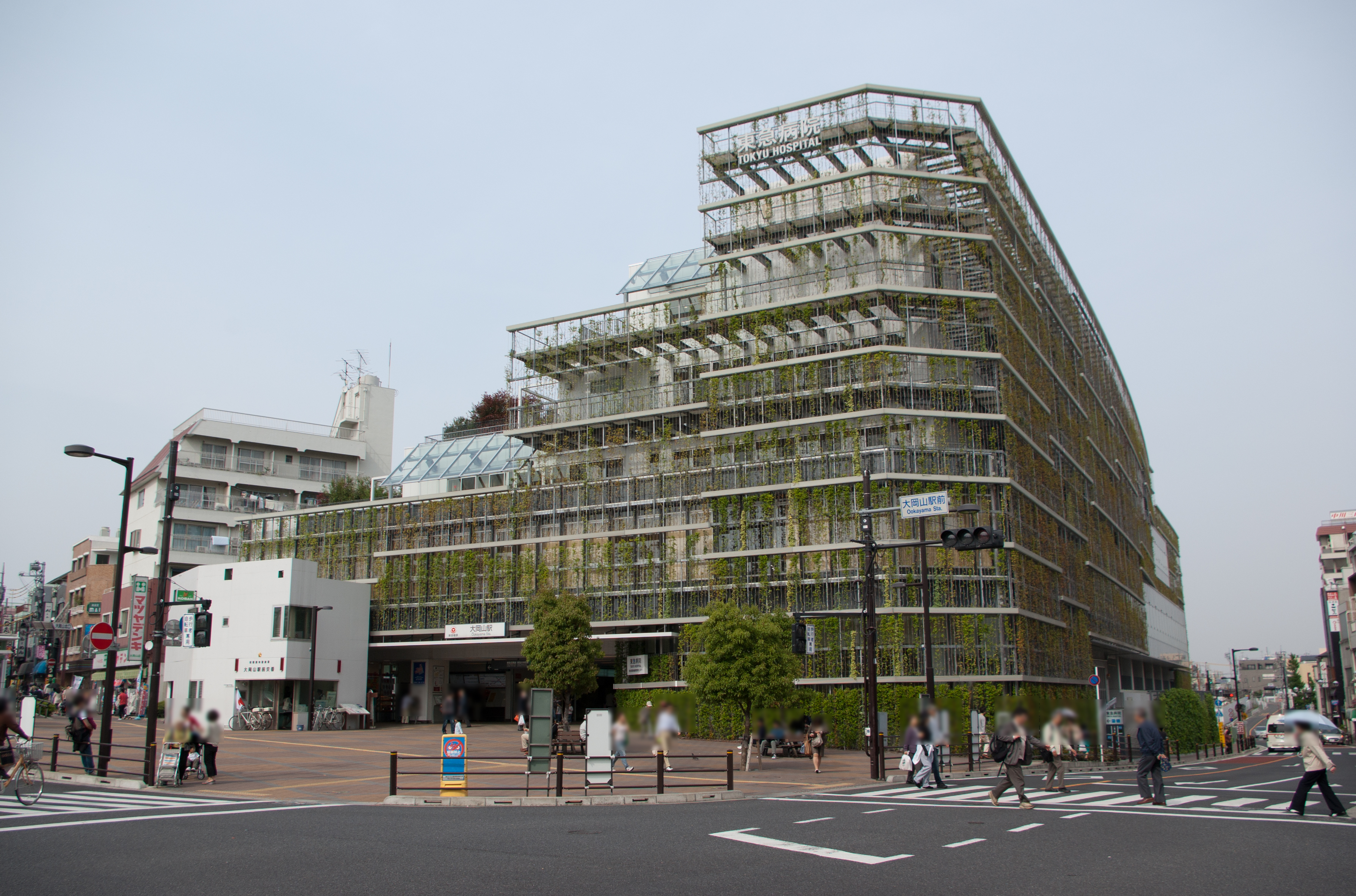

General information
- Location: 3-27-1 Kita-senzoku, Ōta Ward, Tokyo; Japan
- Operator: Tōkyū Railways
- Lines: Meguro Line; Ōimachi Line
- Platforms: 2 island platforms
- Tracks: 4

Construction
- Structure type: Underground

Other information
- Station code: MG06, OM08

History
- Opened: 6 July 1927; 99 years ago

Services
Preceding station	Tōkyū Railways	Following station
Den-en-chōfu towards Hiyoshi	Meguro Line Express	Musashi-Koyama towards Meguro
Okusawa towards Hiyoshi	Meguro Line Local	Senzoku towards Meguro
Jiyūgaoka towards Mizonokuchi	Ōimachi Line Express	Hatanodai towards Ōimachi
Midorigaoka towards Mizonokuchi	Ōimachi Line Local Local	Kita-senzoku towards Ōimachi
Location
- Location within Special wards of Tokyo Location within Tokyo Bay and Bōsō Peninsula Location within Tokyo Location within Japan

Ōokayama Station (大岡山駅, Ōokayama-eki) is a railway station in Ōta, Tokyo, Japan. The station is right on the border between the wards of Meguro and Ōta. The station is facing the main campus of the Tokyo Institute of Technology. Connected to the station is the Tokyu Hospital.

== Lines ==
This station is served by the Tōkyū Ōimachi Line and Tōkyū Meguro Line.

== Station layout ==
This station consists of two island platforms serving four tracks. All platforms are underground and are connected by a surface building.

1	■ Tōkyū Meguro Line	Den-en-chōfu, Musashi-Kosugi, Hiyoshi, Shin-Yokohama, and Futamatagawa
2	■ Tōkyū Ōimachi Line	Jiyūgaoka, Futako-Tamagawa, Mizonokuchi (Den-en-toshi Line) Saginuma, Chuo-Rinkan
3	■ Tōkyū Ōimachi Line	Hatanodai, Oimachi
4	■ Tōkyū Meguro Line	Musashi-Koyama, Meguro (Tokyo Metro Namboku Line) Akabane-Iwabuchi, (Saitama Rapid Railway Line) Urawa-Misono (Toei Mita Line) Nishi-Takashimadaira

== Surrounding area ==
- Tokyo Institute of Technology
- Ōokayama Kitaguchi Shopping Street
