= Jiyūgaoka Station (Tokyo) =

Railway station in Tokyo, Japan

Jiyūgaoka Station 自由が丘駅

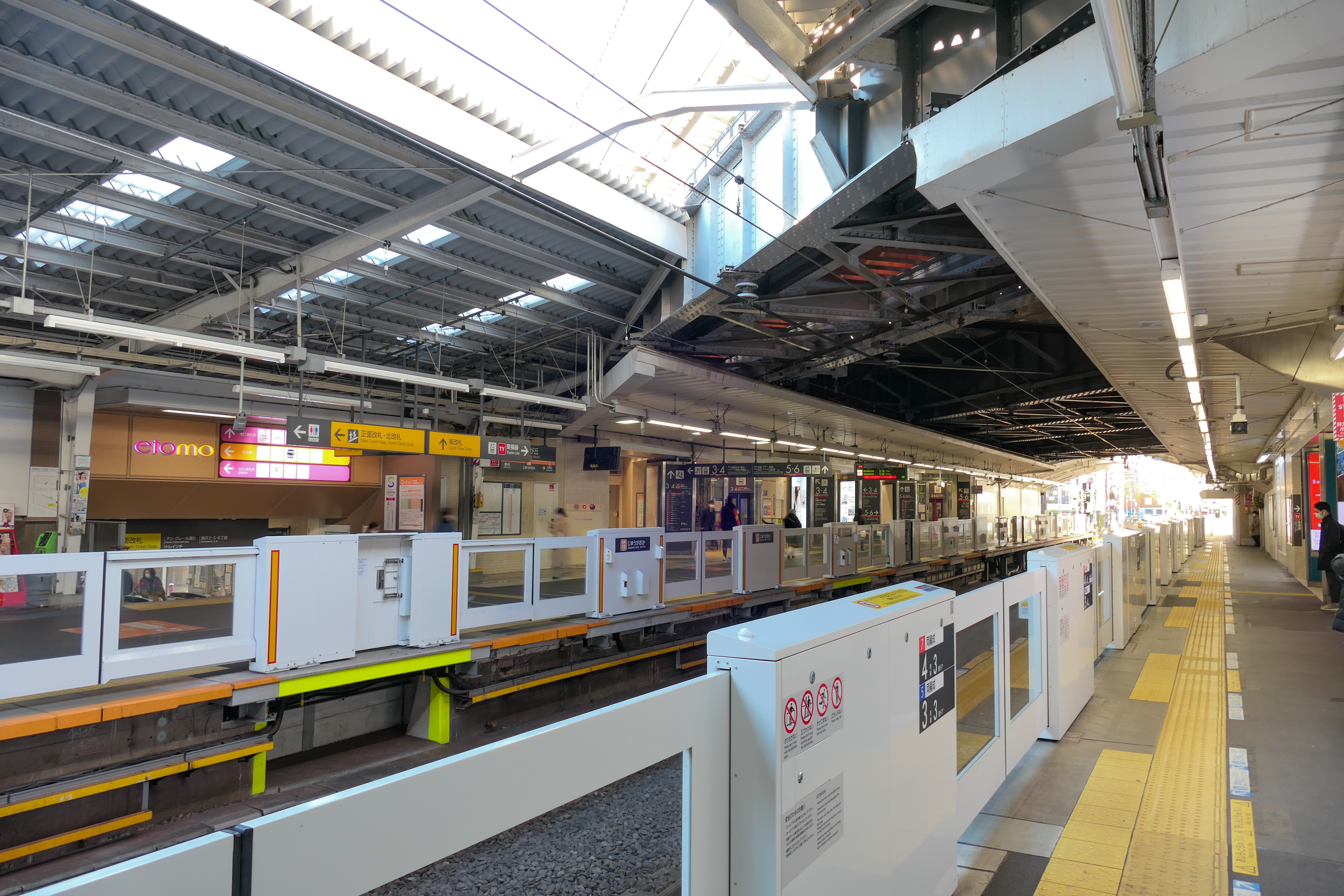
- Jiyugaoka Station Oimachi Line Platform, 18 December 2021

General information
- Location: 1-9-8 Jiyūgaoka, Meguro, Tokyo; Japan
- Coordinates: 35°36′27″N 139°40′09″E
- Operator: Tōkyū Railways
- Lines: Tōyoko Line; Ōimachi Line
- Platforms: 4 (2 side platforms and 2 island platforms)
- Tracks: 6 (4 for Toyoko Line, 2 for Oimachi Line)
- Connections: Bus terminal

Other information
- Station code: TY-07, OM-10
- Website: Official website

History
- Opened: 28 August 1927; 98 years ago
- Former names: Kuhombutsu-mae (until 1929)

Passengers
- 2017: (TY) 99,512 daily (OM) 57,028 daily (Total) 156,540 daily

Services
Preceding station	Tōkyū Railways	Following station
Yokohama towards Motomachi-Chūkagai	S-Train (Weekends and national holidays)	Shibuya towards Seibu-Chichibu
Musashi-kosugi towards Motomachi-Chūkagai	F Liner	Naka-meguro towards Hannō or Ogawamachi
Musashi-kosugi towards Yokohama	Tōyoko Line Limited Express Commuter Express	Naka-meguro towards Shibuya
Den-en-chōfu towards Yokohama	Tōyoko Line Express	Gakugei-daigaku towards Shibuya
Den-en-chōfu towards Yokohama	Tōyoko Line Local	Toritsu-daigaku towards Shibuya
Futako-tamagawa towards Mizonokuchi	Ōimachi Line Express	Ōokayama towards Ōimachi
Kuhombutsu towards Mizonokuchi	Ōimachi Line Local Local	Midorigaoka towards Ōimachi
Location
- Location within Special wards of Tokyo Location within Tokyo Bay and Bōsō Peninsula Location within Tokyo Location within Japan

Jiyūgaoka Station (自由が丘駅, Jiyūgaoka-eki) is a railway station in Meguro, Tokyo, Japan, operated by the private railway operator Tokyu Corporation.

== Lines ==
This station is served by the following lines:

- Tokyu Toyoko Line (TY-07)
- Tokyu Oimachi Line (OM-10)

Jiyūgaoka station is located 6.3 kilometres (3.9 mi) from the terminus of the Tokyu Oimachi Line at Ōimachi Station and 7.0 kilometres (4.3 mi) from the terminus of the Tokyu Toyoko Line at Shibuya station.

== Station layout ==
=== Ground-level platforms ===
1	Tokyu Oimachi Line	for Futako-tamagawa and Mizonokuchi; Den-en-toshi Line for Saginuma and Chūō-rinkan
2	Tokyu Oimachi Line	for Ōokayama, Hatanodai, and Ōimachi

The Tokyu Oimachi Line platforms are scheduled to be lengthened to handle seven-car trains on express services during fiscal 2017.

The station also has a small siding located to the west of the station.

=== Elevated platforms ===
The station has two elevated island platforms for the Tokyu Toyoko Line, serving four tracks.

3-4
5-6
Tokyu Toyoko Line
Tokyu Toyoko Line
- for Musashi-Kosugi, Kikuna, and Yokohama
- Minatomirai Line for Motomachi-Chūkagai
- Sōtetsu Izumino Line for Shōnandai via the Tōkyū/Sōtetsu Shin-yokohama Line
for Naka-Meguro and Shibuya
Fukutoshin Line for Shinjuku-sanchome, Ikebukuro, Kotake-mukaihara, and Wakoshi
Seibu Ikebukuro Line for Hannō
Tōbu Tōjō Line for Shinrin-kōen

== History ==
The station first opened 28 August 1927, as Kuhombutsu-mae Station (九品仏前駅). It was renamed Jiyūgaoka Station (自由ヶ丘駅) (using different Japanese characters than its present name) on 22 October 1929. The characters used in the Japanese station name were changed to the present style on 20 January 1966.

== Surrounding area ==
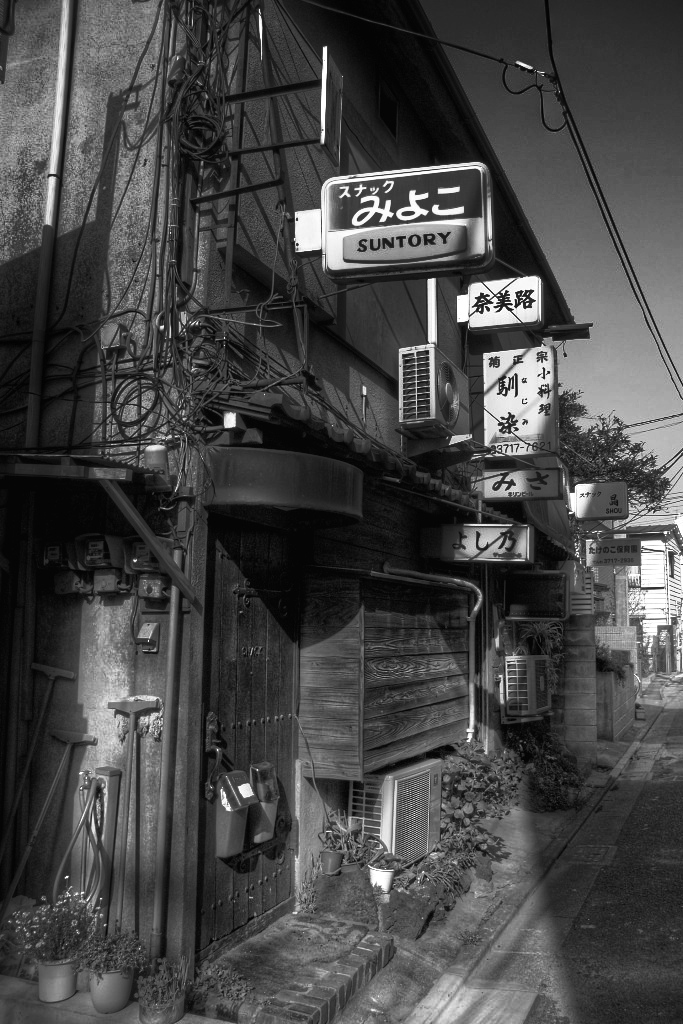
Old bars in Jiyugaoka in April 2008

The surrounding area encompasses the Jiyūgaoka (自由が丘) area of Meguro and Okusawa (奥沢) area of Setagaya.

== Bus services ==
Bus services operated by Tokyu Bus are provided from the Jiyūgaoka bus stop and Jiyugaoka Station Entrance bus stop.

== See also ==
- List of railway stations in Japan
