= Kajigaya Station =

Railway station in Kawasaki, Kanagawa Prefecture, Japan

Kajigaya Station 梶が谷駅

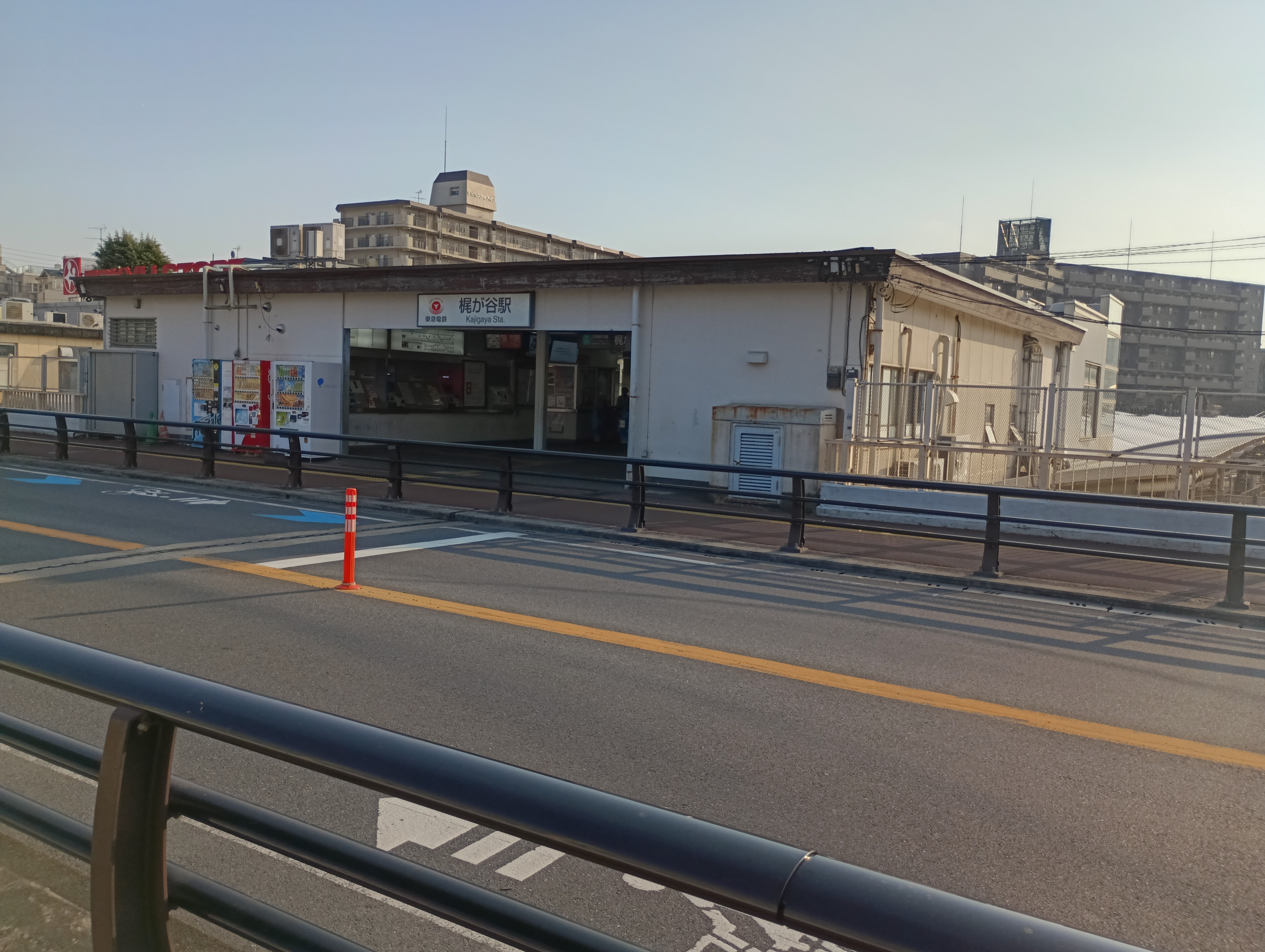
- Station entrance, February 2026

General information
- Location: 85 Suenaga, Takatsu-ku, Kawasaki-shi, Kanagawa-ken 213-0013; Japan
- Coordinates: 35.593699°N 139.605846°E
- Operator: Tōkyū Railways
- Line: Den-en-toshi Line
- Distance: 12.2 km (7.6 mi) from Shibuya
- Platforms: 2 island platforms
- Tracks: 4
- Connections: Bus terminal

Construction
- Structure type: At grade

Other information
- Station code: DT11
- Website: Official website

History
- Opened: 1 April 1966; 60 years ago

Passengers
- FY2019: 29,589

Services
Preceding station	Tōkyū Railways	Following station
Miyazakidai towards Chūō-rinkan	Den-en-toshi Line Local	Mizonokuchi towards Shibuya
Location
- Location within Tokyo Bay and Bōsō Peninsula Location within Kanagawa Prefecture Location within Japan

Kajigaya Station (梶が谷駅, Kajigaya-eki) is a passenger railway station located in Takatsu-ku, Kawasaki, Kanagawa Prefecture, Japan, operated by the private railway company Tokyu Corporation.

== Lines ==
Kajigaya Station is served by the Tōkyū Den-en-toshi Line from Shibuya in Tokyo to Chūō-rinkan in Kanagawa Prefecture. It is 12.2 kilometers from the starting point of the line at Shibuya.

== Station layout ==
The station consists of two island platforms serving a total of four tracks, with the station building located above the platforms. However, since the station is built in a cutting in a hillside, the exits to the station are level with the ground-level road outside.

=== Platforms ===
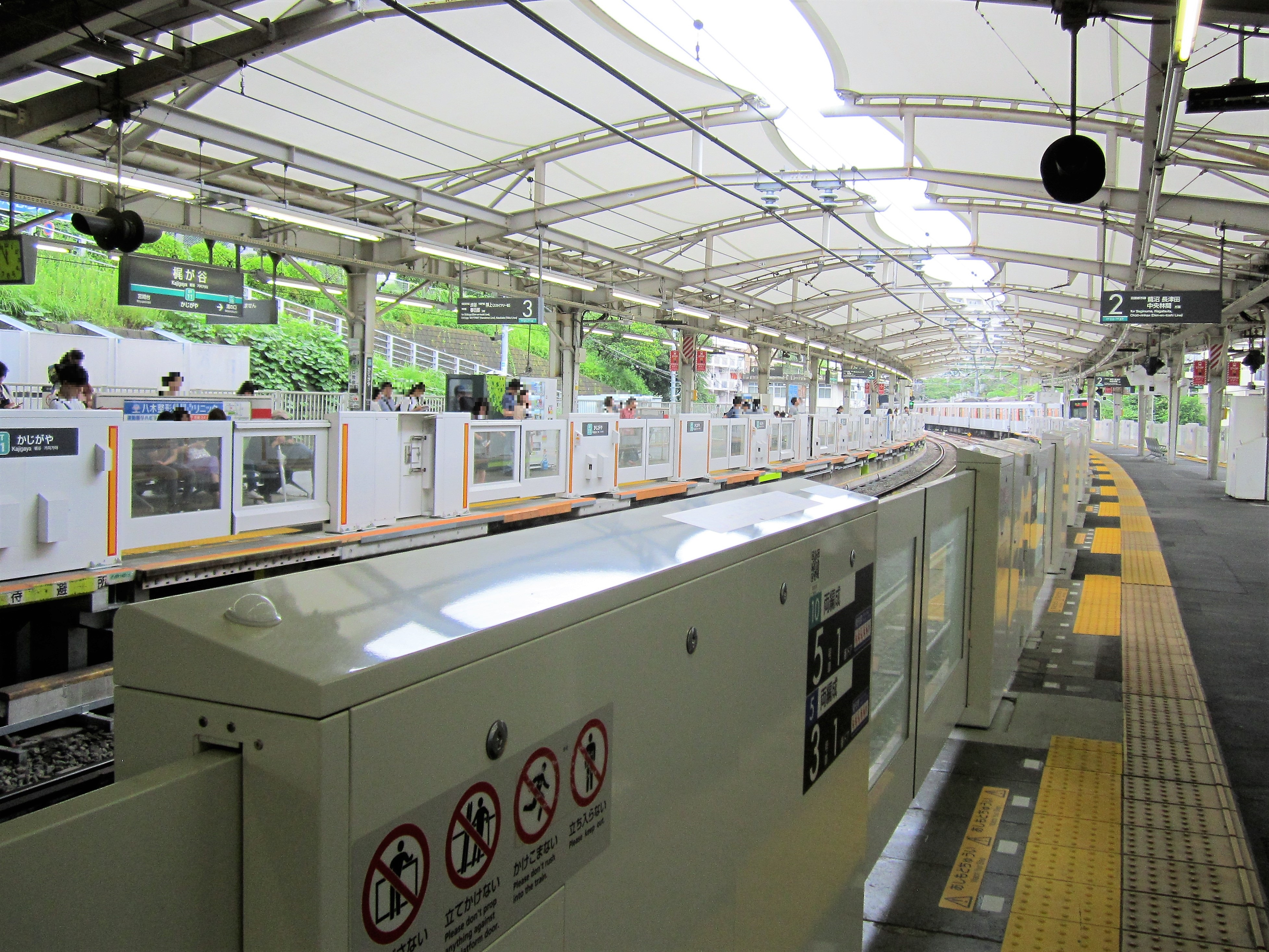
The platforms, June 2019

1	■ Tokyu Den-en-toshi Line	for Saginuma, Nagatsuta, and Chūō-rinkan
2	■ Tokyu Den-en-toshi Line	for Saginuma, Nagatsuta, and Chūō-rinkan
3	■ Tokyu Den-en-toshi Line	for Futako-tamagawa, Shibuya; Oshiage (via Tokyo Metro Hanzomon Line); Kasukabe (via Tobu Isesaki Line)
4	■ Tokyu Den-en-toshi Line	non-stop services

Platform 4 is fenced off and is not used by stopping trains.

== History ==
Kajigaya Station opened on April 1, 1966.

== Passenger statistics ==
In fiscal 2019, the station was used by an average of 29,589 passengers daily.

The passenger figures for previous years are as shown below.

Fiscal year	daily average
2005	35,146
2010	36,151
2015	38,778

== Accidents and incidents ==
- On October 5, 2025, a passenger train heading for Shibuya Station and carrying 149 passengers collided with an out-of-service train containing an apprentice driver and an instructor near the station, causing the latter train to partially derail. No injuries were reported.

== Surrounding area ==
- Takatsu Post Office
- Japan National Route 246
- Omachi Line Depot; depot for the rolling stock for the Oimachi Line

== See also ==
- List of railway stations in Japan
