= Eda Station (Kanagawa) =

Railway station in Yokohama, Japan

Eda Station 江田駅

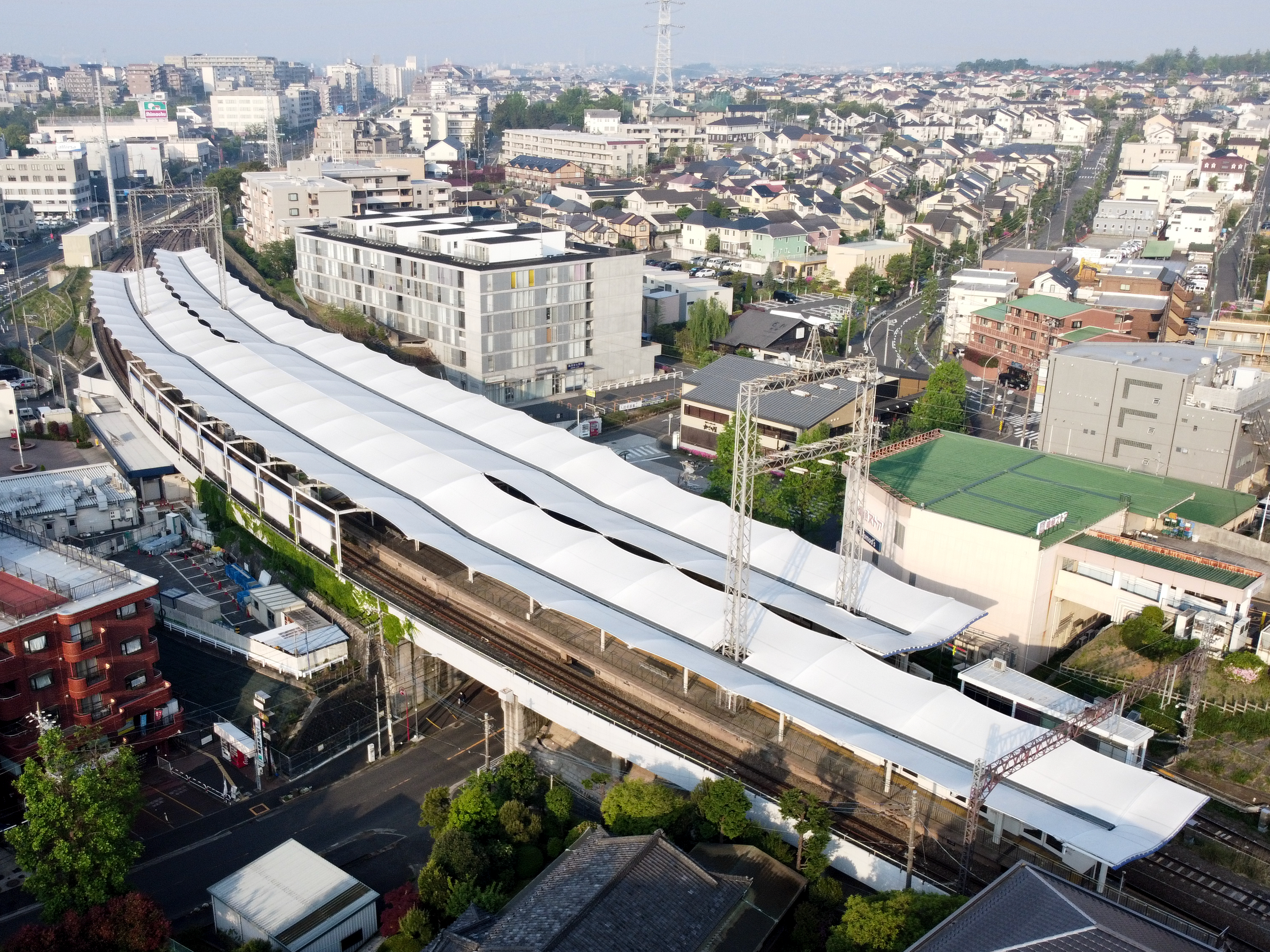
- Eda Station platforms

General information
- Location: 2360 Eda-cho, Aoba Ward, Yokohama City; Kanagawa Prefecture 225-0013; Japan
- Coordinates: 35.558681°N 139.551508°E
- Operator: Tōkyū Railways
- Line: Den-en-toshi Line
- Distance: 19.3 km (12.0 mi) from Shibuya
- Platforms: 2 island platforms
- Tracks: 4
- Connections: Bus terminal

Construction
- Structure type: Elevated

Other information
- Station code: DT17
- Website: Official website

History
- Opened: 1 April 1966; 60 years ago

Passengers
- FY2019: 37,417

Services
Preceding station	Tōkyū Railways	Following station
Ichigao towards Chūō-rinkan	Den-en-toshi Line Local	Azamino towards Shibuya
Location
- Location within Yokohama Location within Kanagawa Prefecture Location within Tokyo Bay and Bōsō Peninsula Location within Japan

Eda Station (江田駅, Eda-eki) is a passenger railway station located in Aoba-ku, Yokohama, Kanagawa Prefecture, Japan, operated by the private railway company Tokyu Corporation.

== Lines ==
Eda Station is served by the Tōkyū Den-en-toshi Line from Shibuya in Tokyo to Chūō-rinkan in Kanagawa Prefecture. It is 19.3 kilometers from the terminus of the line at Shibuya.

== Station layout ==
The station consists of two elevated island platforms serving four tracks. Two tracks are normally reserved for the through passage of express trains. The platforms are connected to the station building by underpasses.

=== Platforms ===
1	■ Tōkyū Den-en-toshi Line	(For Passing)
2	■ Tōkyū Den-en-toshi Line	Nagatsuta ・ Chūō-rinkan
3	■ Tōkyū Den-en-toshi Line	(For Passing)
4	■ Tōkyū Den-en-Toshi Line	Futako-tamagawa ・ Shibuya (Tokyo Metro Hanzōmon Line) Oshiage (Tōbu Isesaki Line) Kasukabe

== History ==
Eda Station was opened on April 1, 1966.

== Passenger statistics ==
In fiscal 2019, the station was used by an average of 37,417 passengers daily.

The passenger figures for previous years are as shown below.

Fiscal year	daily average
2005	36,355
2010	35,248
2015	37,556

== Surrounding area ==
- TEPCO Eda Substation
- Kanagawa Prefectural Eda High School

== See also ==
- List of railway stations in Japan
- 1977 Yokohama F-4 crash (occurred near the station)
