= Miyamaedaira Station =

Railway station in Kawasaki, Kanagawa Prefecture, Japan

Miyamaedaira Station 宮前平駅

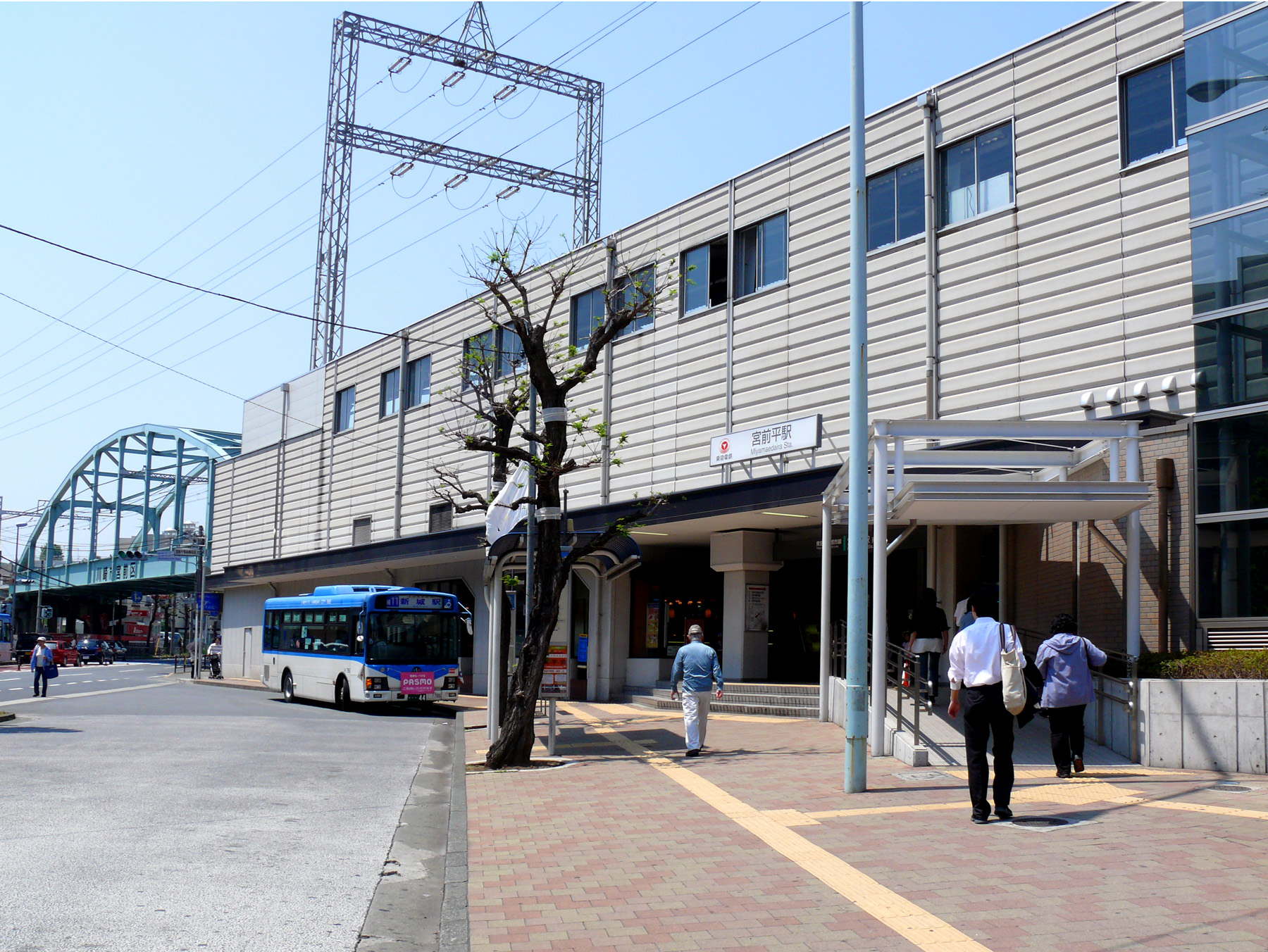
- Miyamaedaira Station

General information
- Location: Miyamaedaira 1-11-1, Miyamae-ku, Kawasaki-shi, Kanagawa-ken 216-0006; Japan
- Coordinates: 35.5850°N 139.5822°E
- Operator: Tōkyū Railways
- Line: Den-en-toshi Line
- Distance: 14.7 km (9.1 mi) from Shibuya
- Platforms: 2 side platforms
- Tracks: 2
- Connections: Bus terminal

Construction
- Structure type: Elevated

Other information
- Station code: DT13
- Website: Official website

History
- Opened: 1 April 1966; 60 years ago

Passengers
- FY2019: 37,275

Services
Preceding station	Tōkyū Railways	Following station
Saginuma towards Chūō-rinkan	Den-en-toshi Line Local	Miyazakidai towards Shibuya
Location
- Location within Tokyo Bay and Bōsō Peninsula Location within Kanagawa Prefecture Location within Japan

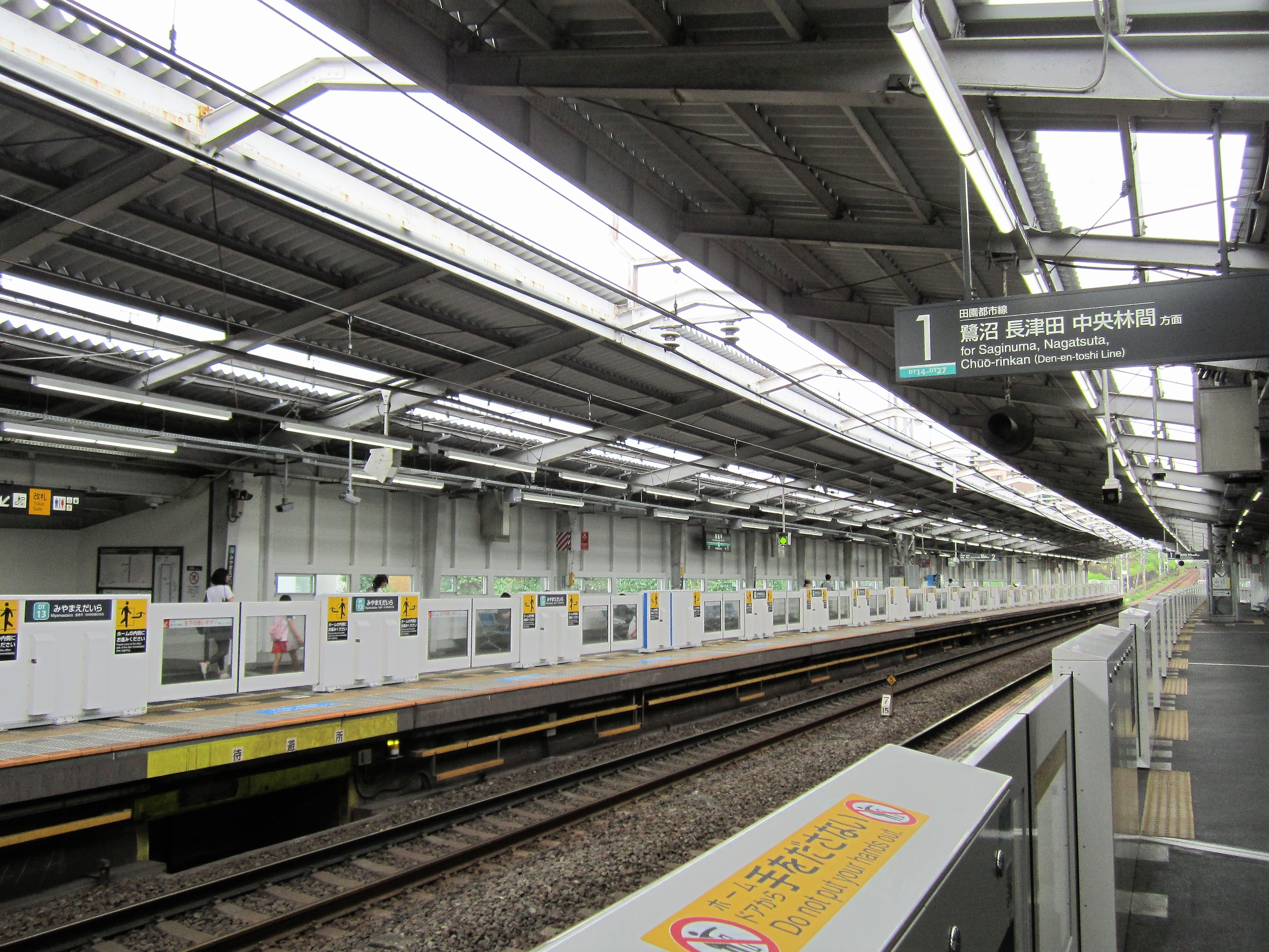
Platforms

Miyamaedaira Station (宮前平駅, Miyamaedaira-eki) is a passenger railway station located in the southern part of Miyamae-ku, Kawasaki, Kanagawa Prefecture, Japan, operated by the private railway company Tokyu Corporation.

== Lines ==
Miyamaedaira Station is served by the Tōkyū Den-en-toshi Line from Shibuya in Tokyo to Chūō-rinkan in Kanagawa Prefecture. It is 14.7 kilometers from the starting point of the line at Shibuya.

== Station layout ==
The station consists of two opposed elevated side platforms serving two tracks. The platforms are connected to the station building by underpasses.

=== Platforms ===
1	■ Tōkyū Den-en-toshi Line	Nagatsuta・Chūō-rinkan
2	■ Tōkyū Den-en-toshi Line	Futako-tamagawa・Shibuya・Oshiage (Tokyo Metro Hanzōmon Line)・Kasukabe (Tōbu Isesaki Line)

== History ==
Miyamaedaira Station was opened on April 1, 1966.

== Passenger statistics ==
In fiscal 2019, the station was used by an average of 37,275 passengers daily.

The passenger figures for previous years are as shown below.

Fiscal year	daily average
2005	44,692
2010	46,893
2015	50,690

== Surrounding area ==
- Kawasaki City Miyamae Ward Office
- Kawasaki City Miyamae Cultural Center
- Kawasaki City Miyamae Library
- Miyamaedaira Children's Cultural Center

== See also ==
- List of railway stations in Japan
