= Miyazakidai Station =

Railway station in Kawasaki, Kanagawa Prefecture, Japan

Miyazakidai Station 宮崎台駅

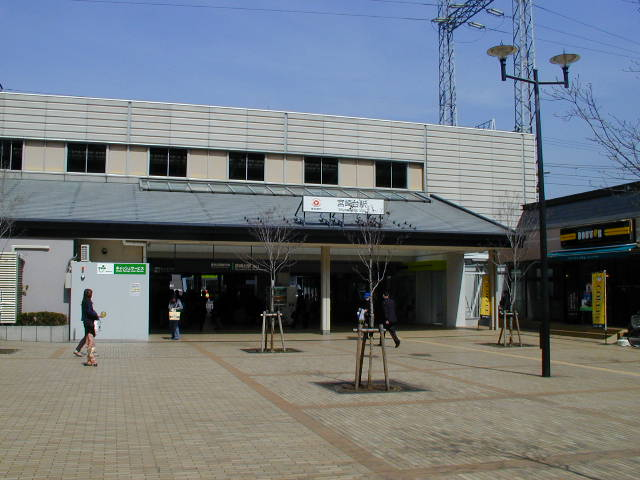

General information
- Location: Miyazaki 2-10-12, Miyamae-ku, Kawasaki-shi, Kanagawa-ken 216-0033; Japan
- Coordinates: 35°35′14.37″N 139°35′28.86″E
- Operator: Tōkyū Railways
- Line: Den-en-toshi Line
- Distance: 13.7 km (8.5 mi) from Shibuya
- Platforms: 2 side platforms
- Tracks: 2
- Connections: Bus terminal

Construction
- Structure type: At grade

Other information
- Station code: DT12
- Website: Official website

History
- Opened: 1 April 1966; 60 years ago

Passengers
- FY2019: 37,290

Services
Preceding station	Tōkyū Railways	Following station
Miyamaedaira towards Chūō-rinkan	Den-en-toshi Line Local	Kajigaya towards Shibuya
Location
- Location within Tokyo Bay and Bōsō Peninsula Location within Kanagawa Prefecture Location within Japan

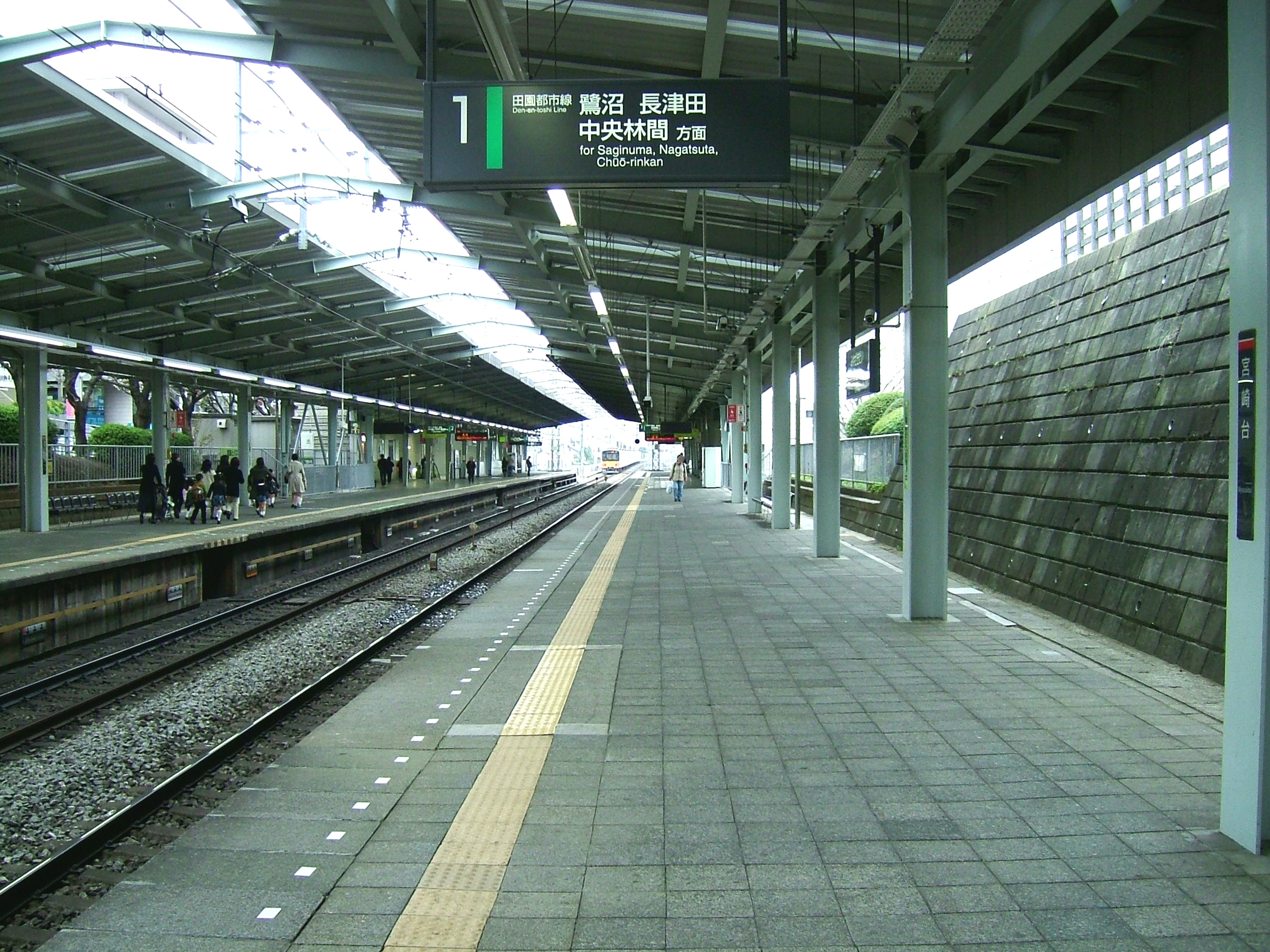
Platforms

Miyazakidai Station (宮崎台駅, Miyazakidai-eki) is a passenger railway station located in the southern part of Miyamae-ku, Kawasaki, Kanagawa Prefecture, Japan, operated by the private railway company Tokyu Corporation.

== Lines ==
Miyazakidai Station is served by the Tōkyū Den-en-toshi Line from Shibuya in Tokyo to Chūō-rinkan in Kanagawa Prefecture. It is 13.7 kilometers from the starting point of the line at Shibuya.

== Station layout ==
The station consists of two opposed elevated side platforms serving two tracks. The platforms are connected to the station building by underpasses.

=== Platforms ===
1	■ Tōkyū Den-en-toshi Line	Nagatsuta・Chūō-rinkan
2	■ Tōkyū Den-en-toshi Line	Futako-tamagawa・Shibuya・Oshiage (Tokyo Metro Hanzōmon Line)・Kasukabe (Tōbu Isesaki Line)

== History ==
Miyazakidai Station was opened on April 1, 1966.

== History ==
Saginuma Station was opened on April 1, 1966. In the spring of 2011, a second ticket gate, on the North side, was added to the station.

== Passenger statistics ==
In fiscal 2019, the station was used by an average of 37,290 passengers daily.

The passenger figures for previous years are as shown below.

Fiscal year	daily average
2005	42,654
2010	44,777
2015	46,792

== Surrounding area ==
- Train and Bus Museum
- Kawasaki City Miyazaki Elementary School
- Kawasaki City Miyazaki Junior High School

== See also ==
- List of railway stations in Japan
