= Mizonokuchi Station =

Railway station in Kawasaki, Kanagawa Prefecture, Japan

Mizonokuchi Station 溝の口駅

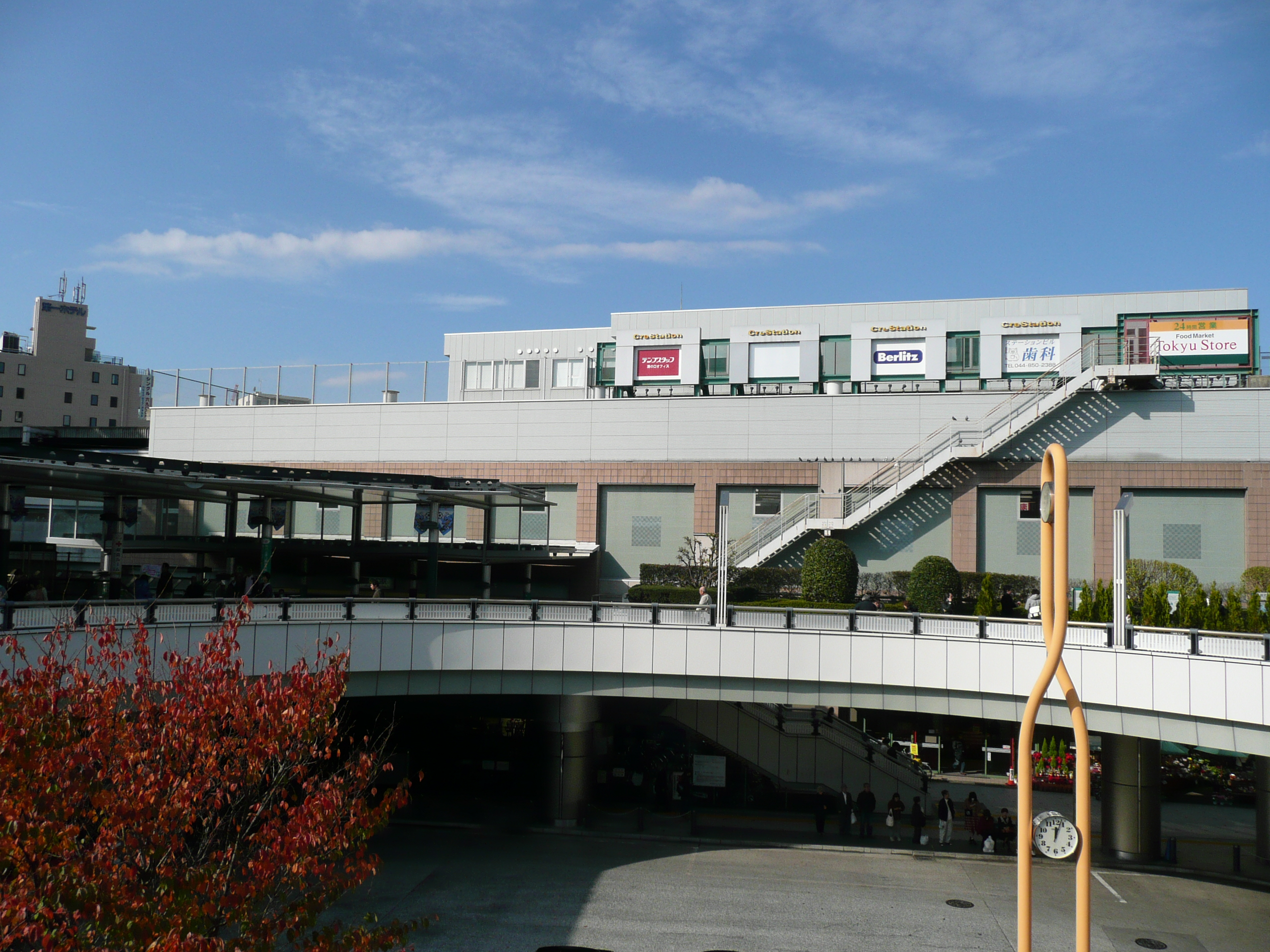
- North side of station, November 2011

General information
- Location: 2-1-1 Mizonokuchi, Takatsu-ku, Kawasaki-shi, Kanagawa-ken 213-0001; Japan
- Coordinates: 35.600029°N 139.610632°E
- Operator: Tōkyū Railways
- Lines: Den-en-toshi Line; Ōimachi Line
- Distance: 11.4 km (7.1 mi) from Shibuya
- Platforms: 2 island platforms
- Tracks: 4
- Connections: JN10 Musashi-Mizonokuchi; Bus terminal

Construction
- Structure type: Elevated

Other information
- Station code: DT10, OM16
- Website: Official website

History
- Opened: 15 July 1927; 99 years ago

Passengers
- FY2019: 213,508

Services
Preceding station	Tōkyū Railways	Following station
Saginuma towards Chūō-rinkan	Den-en-toshi Line Express Semi-Express	Futako-tamagawa towards Shibuya
Kajigaya towards Chūō-rinkan	Den-en-toshi Line Local	Takatsu towards Shibuya
Terminus	Ōimachi Line Express Local	Futako-tamagawa towards Ōimachi
Terminus	Ōimachi Line Local	Takatsu towards Ōimachi
Location
- Location within Tokyo Bay and Bōsō Peninsula Location within Kanagawa Prefecture Location within Japan

Mizonokuchi Station (溝の口駅, Mizonokuchi-eki) is a junction passenger railway station located in Takatsu-ku, Kawasaki, Kanagawa Prefecture, Japan, operated by the private railway operator Tokyu Corporation.

== Lines ==
Mizonokuchi Station is served by the Tōkyū Den-en-toshi Line and Tōkyū Ōimachi Line. It is 11.4 kilometers from the starting point of the Tōkyū Den-en-toshi Line at Shibuya Station, and is the starting point of Tōkyū Ōimachi Line services, which branch off at Futako-tamagawa Station. Musashi-Mizonokuchi Station on the JR East Nambu Line is located adjacent to it.

== Station layout ==
Mizonokuchi Station has two opposed elevated island platforms serving four tracks. The platforms are connected to the station building by underpasses.

=== Platforms ===
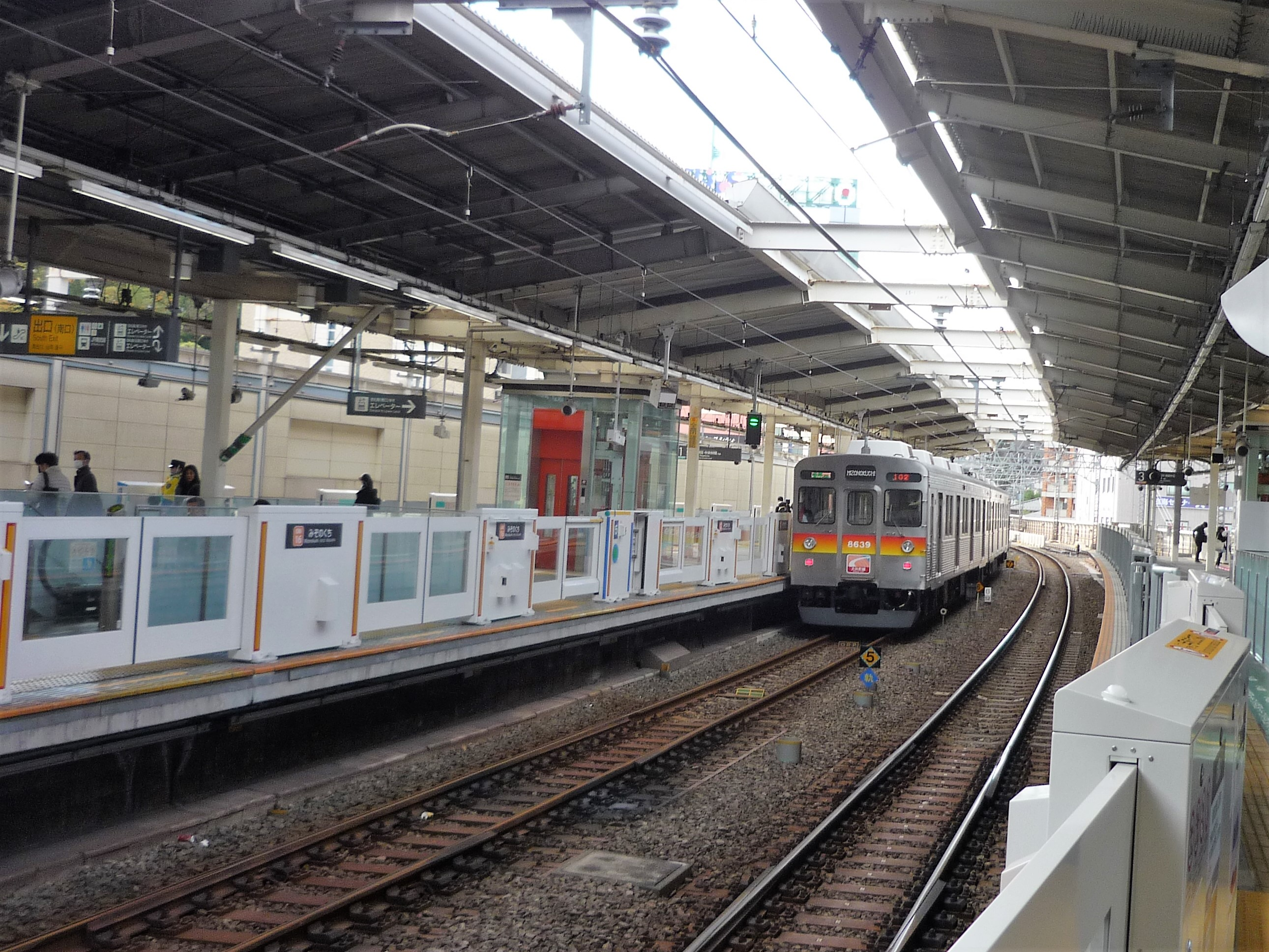
Platform

1	Tōkyū Den-en-toshi Line	for Nagatsuta and Chūō-rinkan
2	Tōkyū Ōimachi Line	alighting (disembarking) only
3	Tōkyū Ōimachi Line	for Futako-tamagawa, Jiyūgaoka, and Ōimachi
4	Tōkyū Den-en-Toshi Line	for Futako-tamagawa and Shibuya; Tokyo Metro Hanzomon Line for Oshiage; Tobu Skytree Line for Tōbu-Dōbutsu-Kōen; Tobu Isesaki Line for Kuki; Tobu Nikko Line for Minami-Kurihashi

== History ==
Mizonokuchi Station opened on July 15, 1927, with the name in Japanese originally written as (溝ノ口駅). The Japanese name was changed to the present format on January 20, 1966. Initially built with a single side platform, the station was expanded in 1992 to four tracks and two island platforms.

== Passenger statistics ==
In fiscal 2019, the station was used by an average of 155,777 passengers daily for the Den-en-Toshi Line and 57,731 passengers daily for the Ōimachi Line

The daily average passenger figures for previous years are as shown below.

Fiscal year	Den-en-Toshi Line	Ōimachi Line
2005	160,957	NA
2010	145,557	40,123
2015	153,059	52,138

== Surrounding area ==
- Musashi-Mizonokuchi Station

== See also ==
- List of railway stations in Japan
