= Saginuma Station =

Railway station in Kawasaki, Kanagawa Prefecture, Japan

Saginuma Station 鷺沼駅

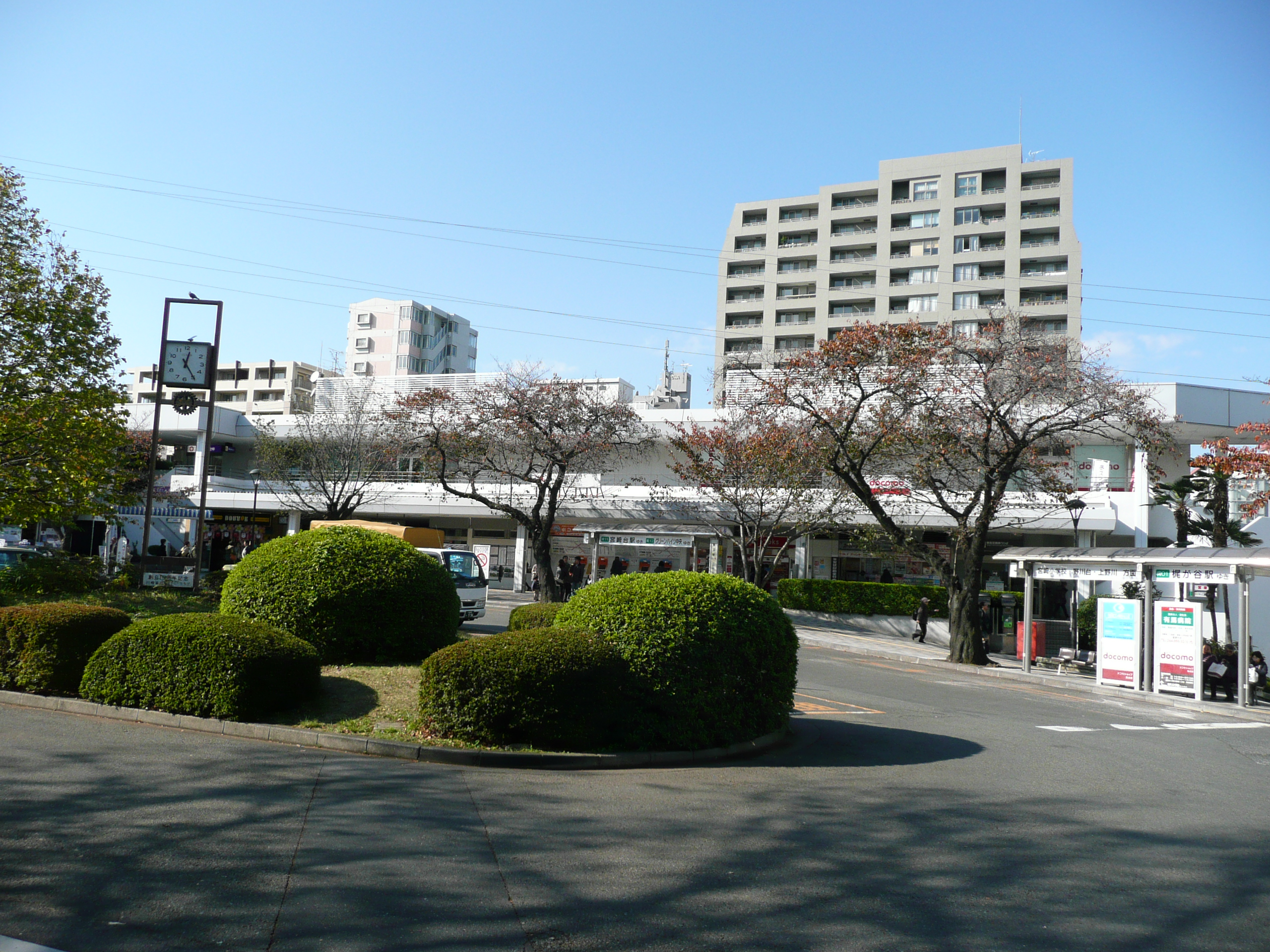
- Saginuma Station

General information
- Location: 3-1-1 Saginuma, Miyamae Ward, Kawasaki City; Kanagawa Prefecture 216-0007; Japan
- Coordinates: 35°34′49″N 139°34′23″E
- Operator: Tōkyū Railways
- Line: Den-en-toshi Line
- Distance: 15.7 km (9.8 mi) from Shibuya
- Platforms: 2 island platforms
- Tracks: 4
- Connections: Bus terminal

Construction
- Structure type: At grade

Other information
- Station code: DT14
- Website: Official website

History
- Opened: 1 April 1966; 60 years ago

Passengers
- FY2019: 46,287

Services
Preceding station	Tōkyū Railways	Following station
Tama-plaza towards Chūō-rinkan	Den-en-toshi Line Express Semi-Express	Mizonokuchi towards Shibuya
Tama-plaza towards Chūō-rinkan	Den-en-toshi Line Local	Miyamaedaira towards Shibuya
Location
- Location within Tokyo Bay and Bōsō Peninsula Location within Kanagawa Prefecture Location within Japan

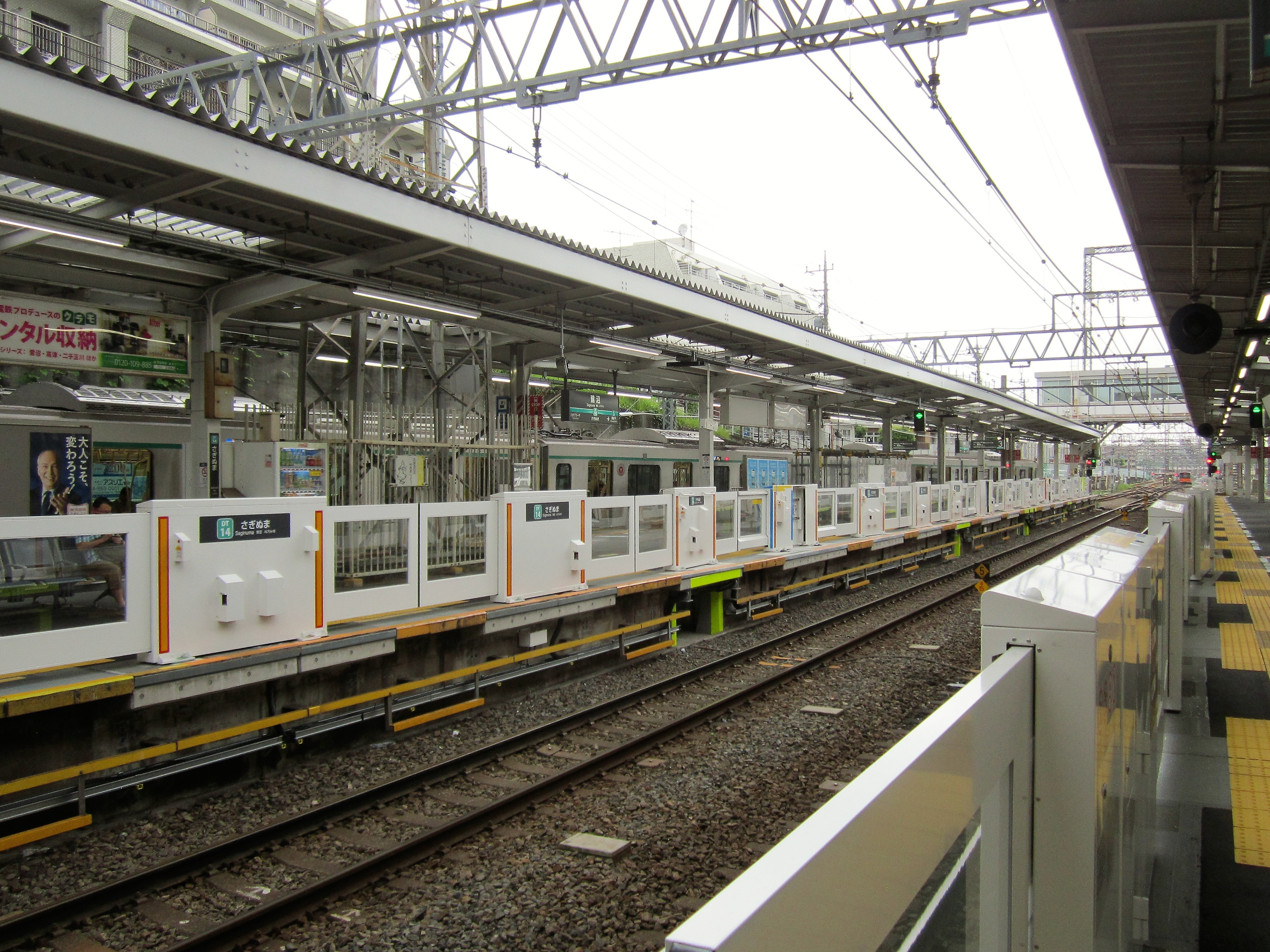
Platforms

Saginuma Station (鷺沼駅, Saginuma-eki) is a passenger railway station located in the southern part of Miyamae-ku, Kawasaki, Kanagawa Prefecture, Japan, operated by the private railway company Tokyu Corporation.

== Lines ==
Saginuma Station is served by the Tōkyū Den-en-toshi Line from Shibuya in Tokyo to Chūō-rinkan in Kanagawa Prefecture. It is 15.7 kilometers from the starting point of the line at Shibuya.

== Station layout ==
The station consists of two island platforms serving four tracks. The platforms are located in a deep cutting in a hill, with the station building located above.

=== Platforms ===
1	■ Tōkyū Den-en-toshi Line	for Nagatsuta and Chūō-rinkan (local services)
2	■ Tōkyū Den-en-toshi Line	for Nagatsuta and Chūō-rinkan (express & semi-express services)
3	■ Tōkyū Den-en-toshi Line	for Futako-tamagawa and Shibuya; Tokyo Metro Hanzomon Line for Oshiage; Tobu Skytree Line for Kita-Koshigaya, Kita-Kasukabe and Tōbu-Dōbutsu-Kōen; Tōbu Nikkō Line for Minami-Kurihashi (express & semi-express services)
4	■ Tōkyū Den-en-toshi Line	for Futako-tamagawa and Shibuya; Tokyo Metro Hanzomon Line for Oshiage; Tobu Skytree Line for Kita-Koshigaya, Kita-Kasukabe and Tōbu-Dōbutsu-Kōen; Tōbu Nikkō Line for Minami-Kurihashi (local services)

== History ==
Saginuma Station was opened on April 1, 1966. In the spring of 2011, a second ticket gate, on the North side, was added to the station.

== Passenger statistics ==
In fiscal 2019, the station was used by an average of 46,287 passengers daily.

The passenger figures for previous years are as shown below.

Fiscal year	daily average
2005	60,883
2010	58,785
2015	62,201

== Surrounding area ==
- Saginuma Park
- Miyamae Post Office
- Kawasaki City Saginuma Elementary School

== See also ==
- List of railway stations in Japan
