= Tsukimino Station =

Railway station in Yamato, Kanagawa Prefecture, Japan

Tsukimino Station つきみ野駅

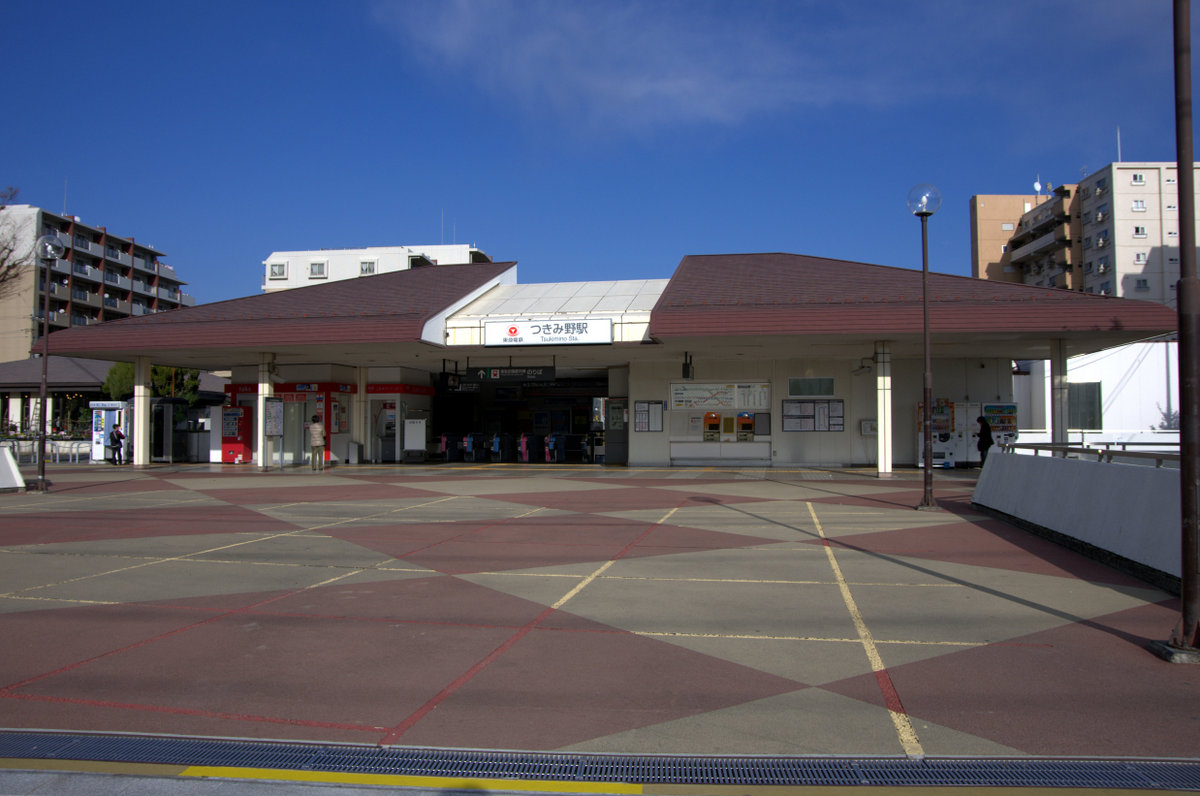
- Tsukimino Station, February 2012

General information
- Location: 5-8-1 Tsukimino, Yamato City; Kanagawa Prefecture 242-0002; Japan
- Coordinates: 35°30′37.206″N 139°27′28.904″E
- Operator: Tōkyū Railways
- Line: Den-en-toshi Line
- Distance: 30.3 km (18.8 mi) from Shibuya
- Platforms: 2 side platforms
- Tracks: 2
- Connections: Bus stop

Construction
- Structure type: Below-grade
- Accessible: Yes

Other information
- Station code: DT-26
- Website: Official website

History
- Opened: 15 October 1976; 49 years ago

Passengers
- FY2019: 10,537 daily

Services
Preceding station	Tōkyū Railways	Following station
Chūō-rinkan Terminus	Den-en-toshi Line Semi-Express Local	Minami-machida Grandberry Park towards Shibuya
Location
- Location within Kanagawa Prefecture Location within Japan

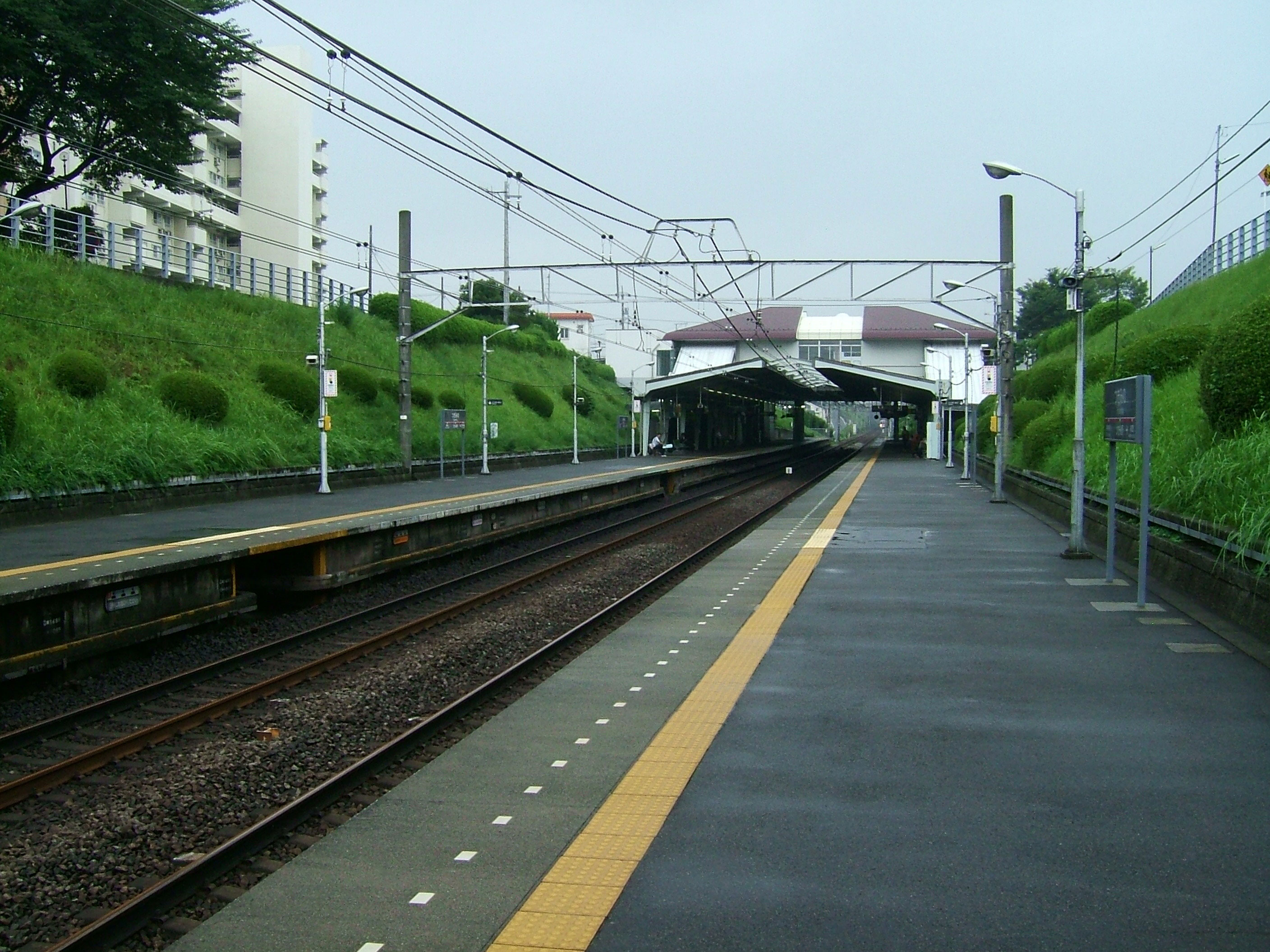
View of the platforms, August 2008

Tsukimino Station (つきみ野駅, Tsukimino-eki) is a passenger railway station located in the city of Yamato, Kanagawa, Japan. It is operated by the private railway operator Tokyu Corporation.

== Lines ==
Tsukimino Station is served by the Tokyu Den-en-toshi Line from Shibuya in Tokyo, and lies 30.3 km from the line's Shibuya terminus.

== Station layout ==
Tsukimino Station has two opposed side platforms serving two tracks. The platforms are connected to the station building by a footbridge.

=== Platforms ===
1	■ Tokyu Den-en-toshi Line	for Chūō-rinkan
2	■ Tokyu Den-en-toshi Line	for Futako-tamagawa, Shibuya, Oshiage (Tokyo Metro Hanzōmon Line), Kasukabe (Tobu Isesaki Line)

From 11 October 2013, an experimental platform edge door system was installed for evaluation purposes on the down (Chūō-rinkan-bound) platform. Originally scheduled to be introduced in the summer of 2013, the low-cost system developed by The Nippon Signal Co., Ltd. consists of 10-m long wire rope screens that are raised and lowered, and is installed along the entire 200 m length of the down platform.

== History ==
Tsukimino Station opened on October 15, 1976.

== Passenger statistics ==
In fiscal 2019, the station was used by an average of 10,537 passengers daily.

The passenger figures for previous years are as shown below.

Fiscal year	daily average
2005	9,957
2010	10,037
2015	10,663

== Surrounding area ==
- Japan National Route 16
- Kanagawa Prefectureal Yamato High School (神奈川県立大和高等学校)
- Yamato Municipal Tsukimino Junior High School (大和市立つきみ野中学校)

== See also ==
- List of railway stations in Japan
