= Futako-Tamagawa Rise =

Building complex in Tokyo, Japan

Coordinates: 35°36′44″N 139°37′42″E

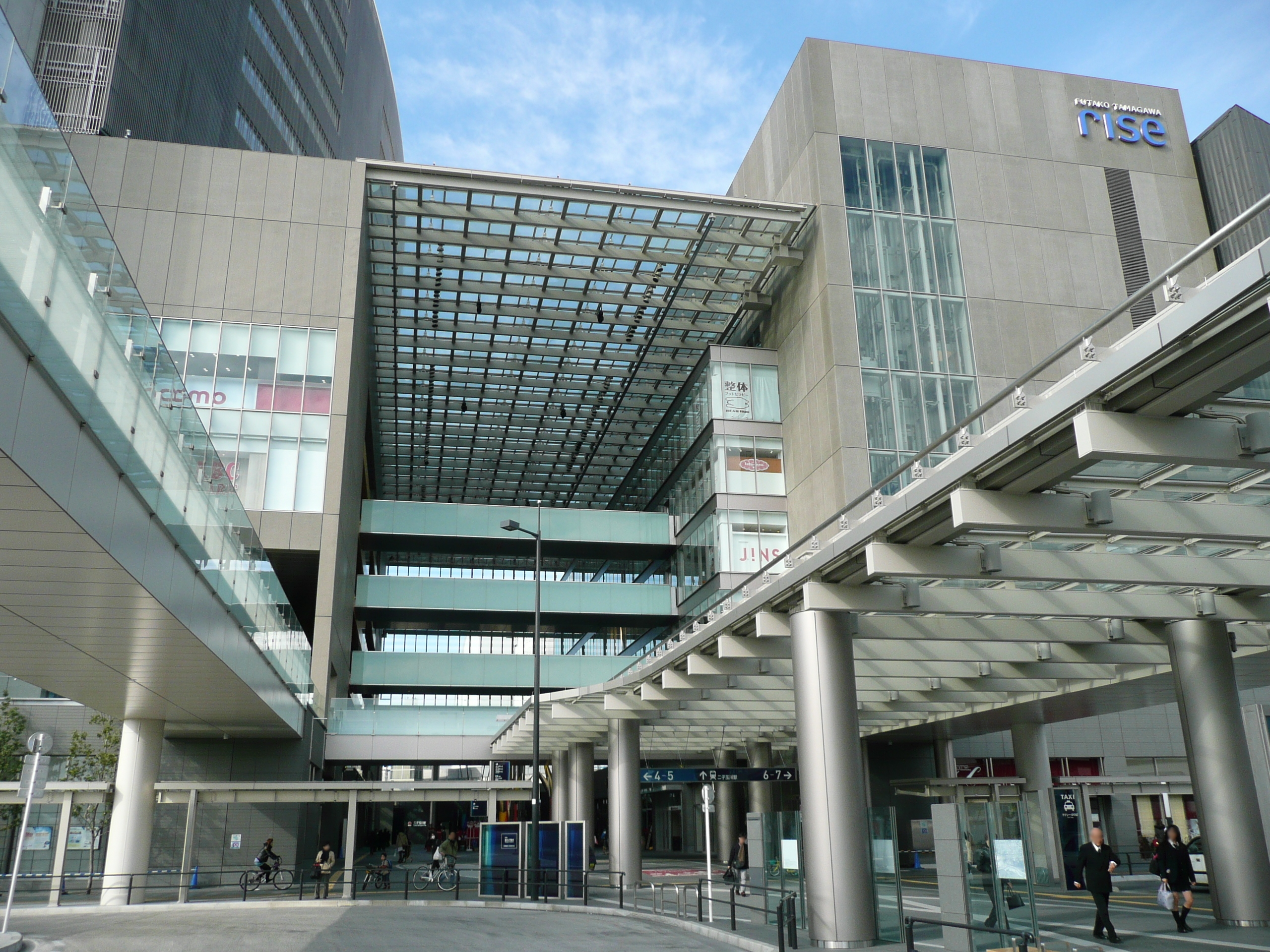
- Interactive map of the Futako-Tamagawa Rise area

General information
- Location: Setagaya, Tokyo, Japan
- Completed: 2015

Height
- Roof: 180 m (590 ft)

The Futako-Tamagawa Rise (二子玉川ライズ) complex comprises an upscale retail shopping series, high-rise apartment towers, and cultural space near the Futako-Tamagawa Station/transportation hub. Located to the east of the FT station on the Tama River marking the southern metropolitan boundary of Tokyo, Futako-Tamagawa is the second major crossing upstream from the mouth of where the Tama River empties into Tokyo Bay. This immediate area was the location of the first then-"suburban" location of Takashimaya in the 1970s. It has had continued growth, development, and even strategic-level planning since its launching of a garden city project (see: Tama New Town) since the 1920s launching. It is near the Den-en-chōfu upscale residential area. Futako-Tamagawa Rise currently has two of its three development projects complete, including 151m tall towers, making them among the top 150 tallest buildings in Tokyo. Futako-Tamagawa, meanwhile, is listed in travel literature as being "core" or "central" Tokyo.

The FT Rise retail area, across a street from the Takashimaya-complex, is connected to it by underground and carries its own list of prestige tenants, including Oshman's, MUJI, Uniqlo, H&M, Tokyu Food Show, as well as more middle-zone businesses. The architectural style is marked by an international style evoking Piet Mondrian and its lighting/LED received English-language coverage despite the complex launch was scheduled a few days after the Fukushima incident; there were some last-minute modifications. FT Rise Towers will remain under construction until 2015. Apartment prices have been reported in media at $1.8 million for purchase or $11,000+/month in rent but only several hundred meters away more normal Tokyo prices of a few hundred/month for small efficiencies prevail.
