= Den-en-toshi Line =

Railway line in Japan

Coordinates: 35°31′55″N 139°29′40″E

Den-en-Toshi Line

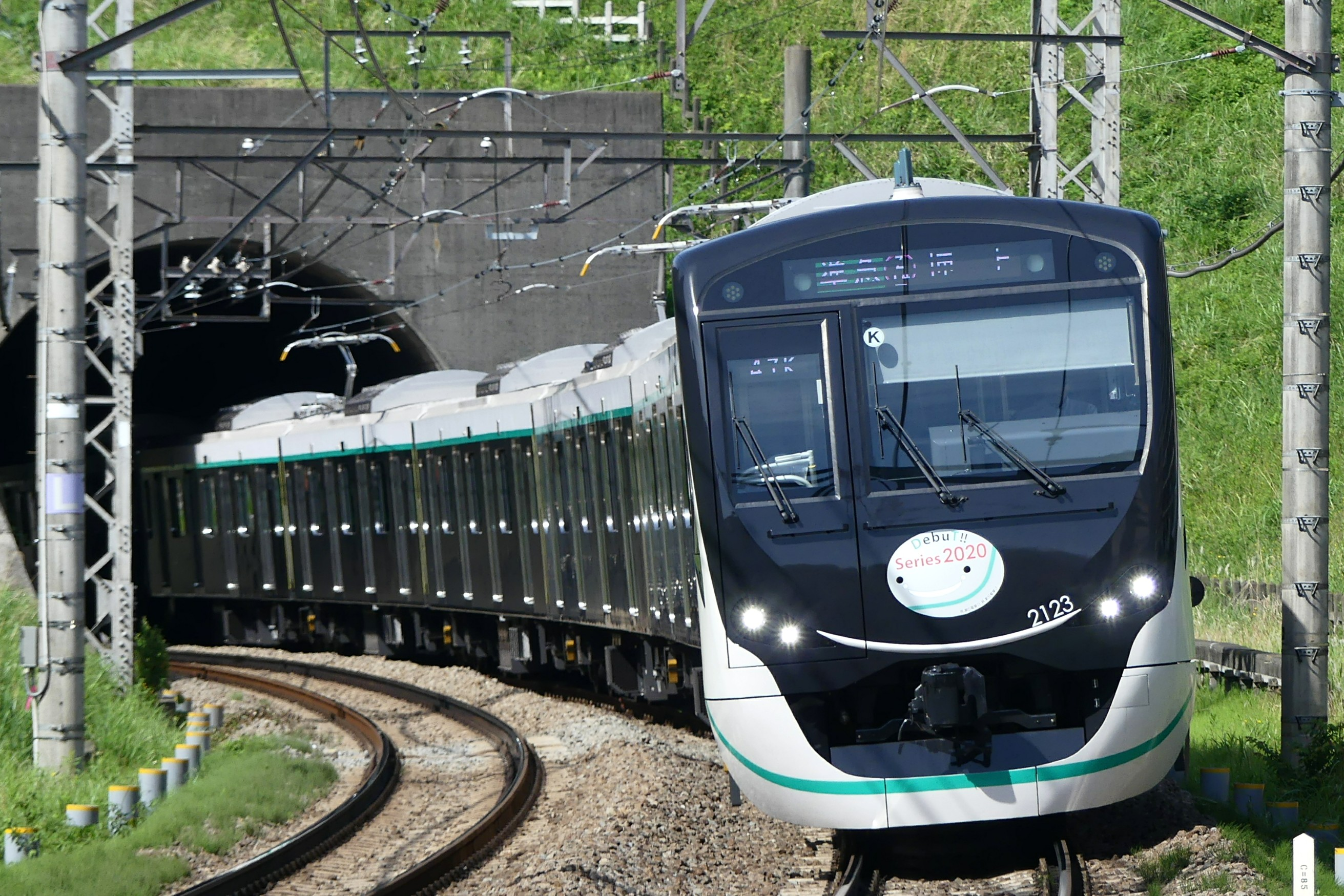
- A Tokyu 2020 series EMU in May 2018

Overview
- Native name: 田園都市線
- Status: In service
- Owner: Tokyu Corporation
- Locale: Kantō Region
- Termini: Chūō-rinkan; Shibuya
- Stations: 27
- Color on map: Green (#20A288)

Service
- Type: Commuter rail
- System: Tokyu Railways
- Route number: DT
- Operator: Tokyu Corporation
- Depot: Nagatsuta
- Daily ridership: 1,274,503 daily (2017)

History
- Opened: 11 October 1963; 63 years ago

Technical
- Line length: 31.5 km (19.6 mi)
- Track gauge: 1,067 mm (3 ft 6 in)
- Electrification: 1,500 V DC overhead catenary

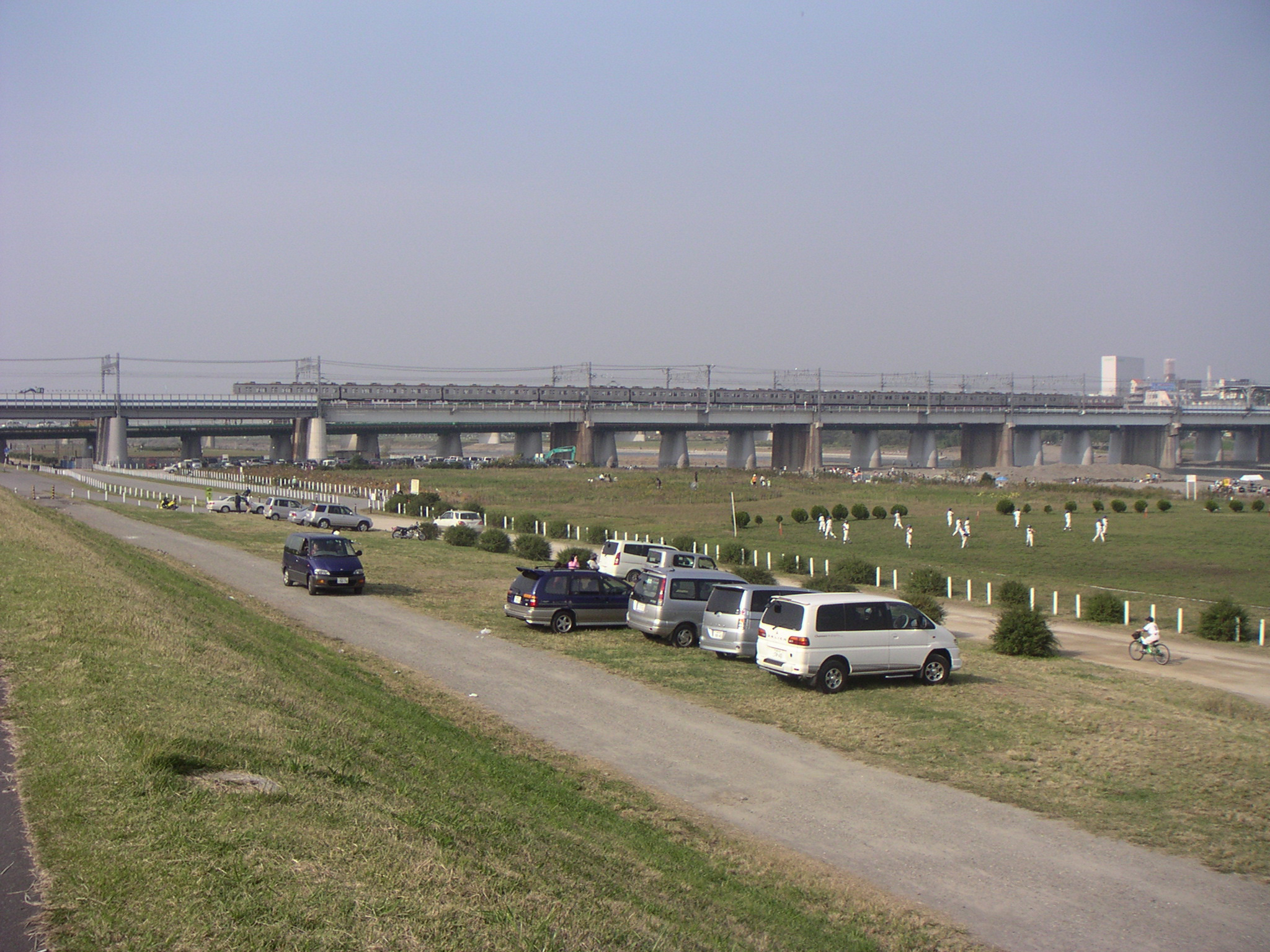
Denentoshi line crossing Tama River, south of Futako-Tamagawa Station

The Den-en-toshi Line (田園都市線, Den'entoshi-sen; "Garden City Line") is a major commuter line operated by the private railway operator Tokyu Corporation and connecting south-western suburbs of Tokyo and neighboring Kanagawa Prefecture, with its western terminus of Chūō-Rinkan, to a major railway junction of western downtown Tokyo, Shibuya. At Shibuya, nearly all the trains continue on the Tokyo Metro Hanzōmon Line. With a route length of 31.5 km (19.6 mi), it is the longest railway line operated by Tokyu Corporation.

The line's color on maps and station guides is green, and stations carry the prefix "DT" followed by a number.

== History ==
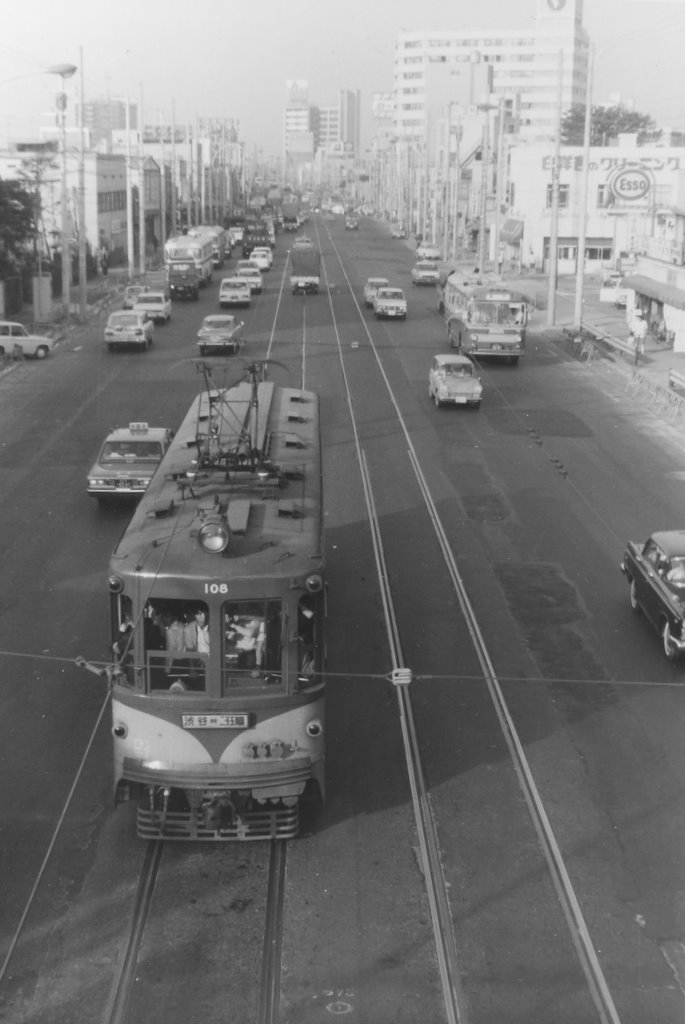
Den-en-toshi Line was built underneath the road where the original Tamagawa Interurban Line ran

=== Prewar predecessors ===
On 6 March 1907, the Tamagawa Electric Railway (玉川電気鉄道, Tamagawa Denki Tetsudō; "Tamaden") opened the first section of an interurban line between Shibuya and what is now Futako-Tamagawa, using 1,372 mm (4 ft 6 in) gauge. The line was called the Tamagawa Line (玉川線) and is not to be confused with today's Tokyu Tamagawa Line (東急多摩川線). The branch from Sangen-Jaya Station opened on 18 January 1925.

=== Tama Den-En-Toshi Plan ===
In 1953, Tokyu Group president Keita Gotō unveiled a "new town" planning scheme called the South-Western Area Development Plan. He envisioned new railway line and freeway and large, clean houses for commuters working in Tokyo. The railway line would become the Tama Den-En-Toshi Line and the expressway the Tōmei Expressway. The parts of the new line completely overlaps the Tamagawa Line and the project is known as the Shin-Tamagawa Line or "New Tamagawa Line" which runs in an underground alignment under the old interurban line. The Tamagawa Line was closed in 1969 in anticipation for the opening of the Shin-Tamagawa Line, with the remaining branch line of the Tamagawa Electric Railway split off into the present Tokyu Setagaya Line. The underground Shin-Tamagawa Line opened a few years later in 1977, completely replacing the closed interurban line. Upon opening it was treated as a separate line from the Ōimachi Line connecting to said line at Futako-Tamagawa.

=== Development of the line ===
In 2000, Tama Den-En-Toshi Line as depicted today was created by merging the Shin-Tamagawa Line and the section of the Ōimachi Line west of Futako-Tamagawa. Trains through servicing into the Tokyo Metro Hanzōmon Line was extended beyond Suitengūmae into Isesaki Line and Nikkō Line of Tobu Railway on 19 March 2003.

Tokyu has expanded the line to four tracks from Futako-Tamagawa to Mizonokuchi; most trains of the Ōimachi line run through this section to Mizonokuchi, with some local trains making the intermediate stops. This service began in June 2009, postponed from fiscal 2007. Ōimachi line trains, which are 5- or 7-car sets, will then run between Ōimachi and Mizonokuchi.

=== Accidents and incidents ===
On 5 October 2025, around 11:00 p.m, the rear car of an out-of-service Tokyu 5000 series (set 5101) was struck by an oncoming Shibuya-bound Tokyu 2020 series train (set 2035) as it was entering a layover track. The impact caused the out-of-service train to derail. It was hosting a trainee driver under instruction and had reportedly stopped slightly ahead of its designated position, leaving part of the train protruding onto the active track. The collision caused visible damages but no serious injuries were reported among the 149 passengers on board the moving train or among the crew on the stationary train. Following the collision, the operator disclosed that a "signal-setting error" had persisted for years since maintenance works were carried out in 2015. Following the collision, normal services on the Den-en-toshi Line were partially suspended for a few days, with nearby lines such as the Ōimachi Line and the Tokyo Metro Hanzōmon Line also experiencing service suspensions and disruptions. This was caused by the collided trains blocking the trains in train depot from exiting. Tokyu Railways deployed maintenance crews to remove the derailed 5000 series car and to inspect track and signal equipment near Kajigaya Station. To prevent similar accidents, Tokyu Railways inspected 33 other stations with similar track layout.

The accident led to service reductions being implemented on the Den-en-toshi Line with the start of the revised timetable in March 2026. Two months later, Tokyu Railways announced that it would order twenty-three 2020 series cars: three cars to be incorporated into the damaged 2020 series set and two 10-car sets. The operator also announced its goal for the order to be completed by the end of fiscal year 2027.

== Operation ==
Nearly all trains on the Den-en-toshi Line are operated through to/from the Tokyo Metro Hanzomon Line using Tokyu, Tokyo Metro, and Tobu Railway 10-car EMUs. Around half of them continue beyond Oshiage, the terminus of the Hanzomon Line, to the Tobu Skytree Line (Kita-Koshigaya Station, Kita-Kasukabe Station and Tōbu-Dōbutsu-Kōen Station), Tobu Isesaki Line (Kuki Station), and Tōbu Nikkō Line (Minami-Kurihashi Station). At rush hour, an inbound train arrives as frequently as every 2 minutes 10 seconds.

=== Service types ===
The following three types of service are operated on the line.

Local (各駅停車, Kakueki-teisha) (L)
Stops at all stations. Eight services per hour in each direction during the daytime. Two of eight are not through service to the Hanzōmon Line.
Semi-Express (準急, Junkyū) (SE)
In the morning rush hour, all limited-stop services are semi-express.
In the daytime, two services are operated per hour in each direction and connect to a local train at Shibuya (outbound only), Saginuma and Nagatsuta (inbound only).
Express (急行, Kyūkō) (Ex)
Not operated in morning rush hour. In the daytime, six services are operated per hour in each direction and two of six is through to the Ōimachi Line. Most express connect to a local train at Sangen-jaya (inbound only), Futako-tamagawa (outbound and through service to the Ōimachi Line), Saginuma and Nagatsuta.

=== Through trains to Ōimachi Line ===
On weekends, two seven-car express trains per days are operated to/from Ōimachi and Nagatsuta. Also, a few trains are operated through to/from the Tōkyū Ōimachi Line to utilize forwarding operations to/from Saginuma depot, up to Ōimachi in the mornings, and down to Saginuma in the late evenings. These formations are 7-car sets, unlike the 10-car trains normally used on the line. A few express trains during the holidays also serve from Chūō-Rinkan in the mornings, down in the evenings.

== Stations ==
Map

No.	Station	Distance in km (mi)	Semi-express	Express	Transfers	Location	
↑ Through-services to/from:↑: Kuki via Hanzōmon Line, Tobu Skytree Line and Isesaki Line; Minami-kurihashi via Hanzōmon Line, Tobu Skytree Line and Nikkō Line
DT-01	Shibuya 渋谷	0 (0)	●	●	Hanzōmon Line (Z-01); Tōyoko Line (TY01); Yamanote Line (JY20); Saikyō Line (JA10); Shōnan–Shinjuku Line (JS19); Inokashira Line (IN01); Ginza Line (G-01) (Note: The transfer between the Hanzomon Line and the Ginza Line at Shibuya is an out-of-system transfer since they are separate stations. Due to the distance between the two stations, transfers between the two lines are announced at Omotesandō.); Fukutoshin Line (F-16)	Shibuya	Tokyo
DT-02	Ikejiri-ōhashi 池尻大橋	1.9 (1.2)	●	|		Setagaya	Tokyo
DT-03	Sangen-jaya 三軒茶屋	3.3 (2.1)	●	●	Setagaya Line (SG01)	Setagaya	Tokyo
DT-04	Komazawa-daigaku 駒沢大学	4.8 (3.0)	●	|		Setagaya	Tokyo
DT-05	Sakura-shimmachi 桜新町	6.3 (3.9)	●	|		Setagaya	Tokyo
DT-06	Yōga 用賀	7.6 (4.7)	●	|		Setagaya	Tokyo
DT-07	Futako-tamagawa 二子玉川	9.4 (5.8)	●	●	Ōimachi Line (OM15)	Setagaya	Tokyo
DT-08	Futako-shinchi 二子新地	10.1 (6.3)	|	|	Ōimachi Line	Takatsu-ku, Kawasaki	Kanagawa
DT-09	Takatsu 高津	10.7 (6.6)	|	|	Ōimachi Line	Takatsu-ku, Kawasaki	Kanagawa
DT-10	Mizonokuchi 溝の口	11.4 (7.1)	●	●	Ōimachi Line (OM16); Nambu Line (Musashi-Mizonokuchi: JN10)	Takatsu-ku, Kawasaki	Kanagawa
DT-11	Kajigaya 梶が谷	12.2 (7.6)	|	|		Takatsu-ku, Kawasaki	Kanagawa
DT-12	Miyazakidai 宮崎台	13.7 (8.5)	|	|		Miyamae-ku, Kawasaki	Kanagawa
DT-13	Miyamaedaira 宮前平	14.7 (9.1)	|	|		Miyamae-ku, Kawasaki	Kanagawa
DT-14	Saginuma 鷺沼	15.7 (9.8)	●	●		Miyamae-ku, Kawasaki	Kanagawa
DT-15	Tama-plaza たまプラーザ	17.1 (10.6)	●	●		Aoba-ku, Yokohama	Kanagawa
DT-16	Azamino あざみ野	18.2 (11.3)	●	●	Blue Line (B32)	Aoba-ku, Yokohama	Kanagawa
DT-17	Eda 江田	19.3 (12.0)	|	|		Aoba-ku, Yokohama	Kanagawa
DT-18	Ichigao 市が尾	20.6 (12.8)	|	|		Aoba-ku, Yokohama	Kanagawa
DT-19	Fujigaoka 藤が丘	22.1 (13.7)	|	|		Aoba-ku, Yokohama	Kanagawa
DT-20	Aobadai 青葉台	23.1 (14.4)	●	●		Aoba-ku, Yokohama	Kanagawa
DT-21	Tana 田奈	24.5 (15.2)	|	|		Aoba-ku, Yokohama	Kanagawa
DT-22	Nagatsuta 長津田	25.6 (15.9)	●	●	Kodomonokuni Line (KD01); Yokohama Line (JH21)	Midori-ku, Yokohama	Kanagawa
DT-23	Tsukushino つくし野	26.8 (16.7)	●	|		Machida	Tokyo
DT-24	Suzukakedai すずかけ台	28.0 (17.4)	●	|		Machida	Tokyo
DT-25	Minami-machida Grandberry Park 南町田グランベリーパーク	29.2 (18.1)	●	●		Machida	Tokyo
DT-26	Tsukimino つきみ野	30.3 (18.8)	●	|		Yamato	Kanagawa
DT-27	Chūō-rinkan 中央林間	31.5 (19.6)	●	●	Enoshima Line (OE02)	Yamato	Kanagawa

== Rolling stock ==
=== Current ===
- Tokyu 2020 series
- Tokyu 5000 series
- Tokyo Metro 8000 series
- Tokyo Metro 08 series
- Tokyo Metro 18000 series
- Tobu 50000 series
- Tobu 50050 series
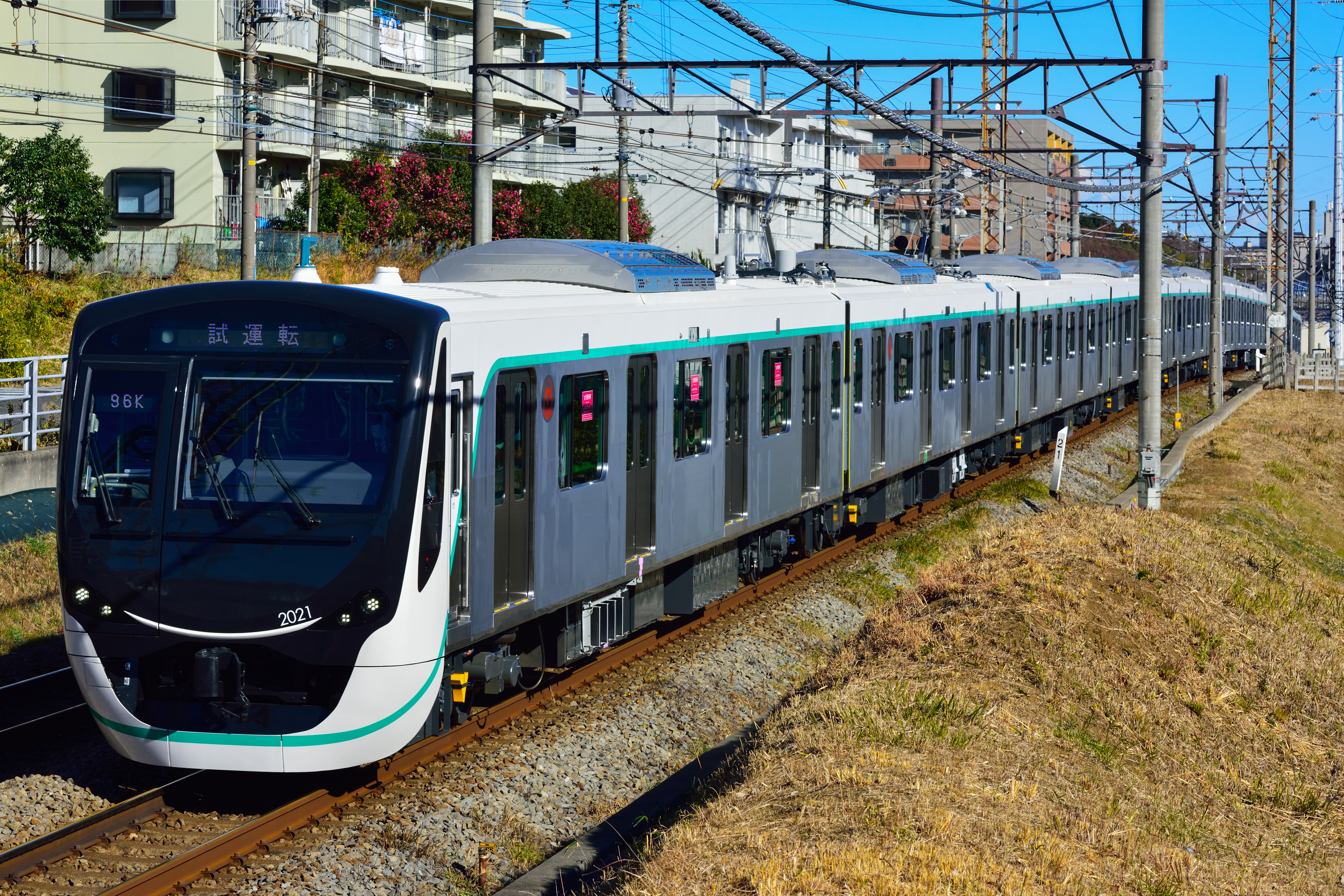
Tokyu 2020 series

Tokyu 5000 series

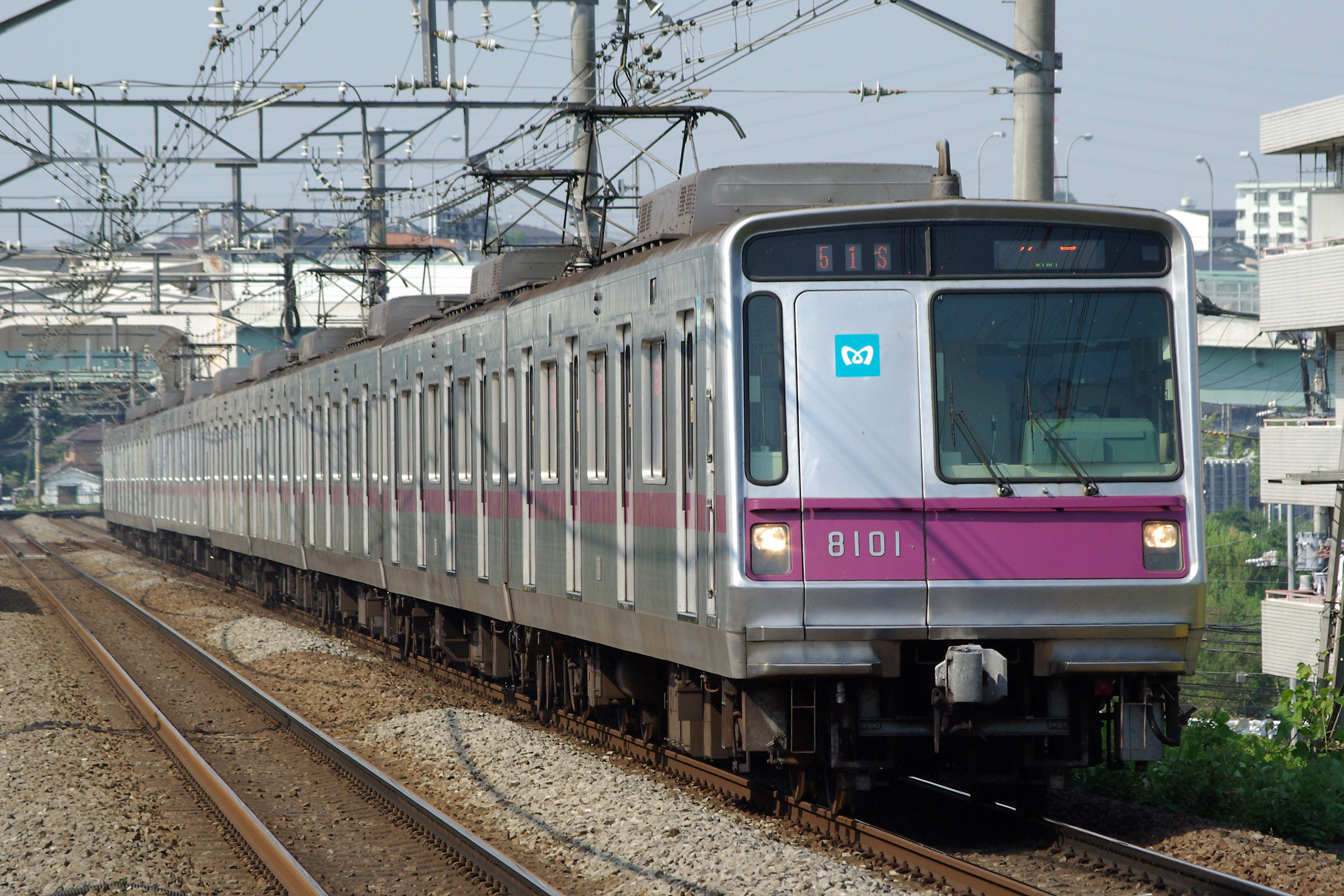
Tokyo Metro 8000 series

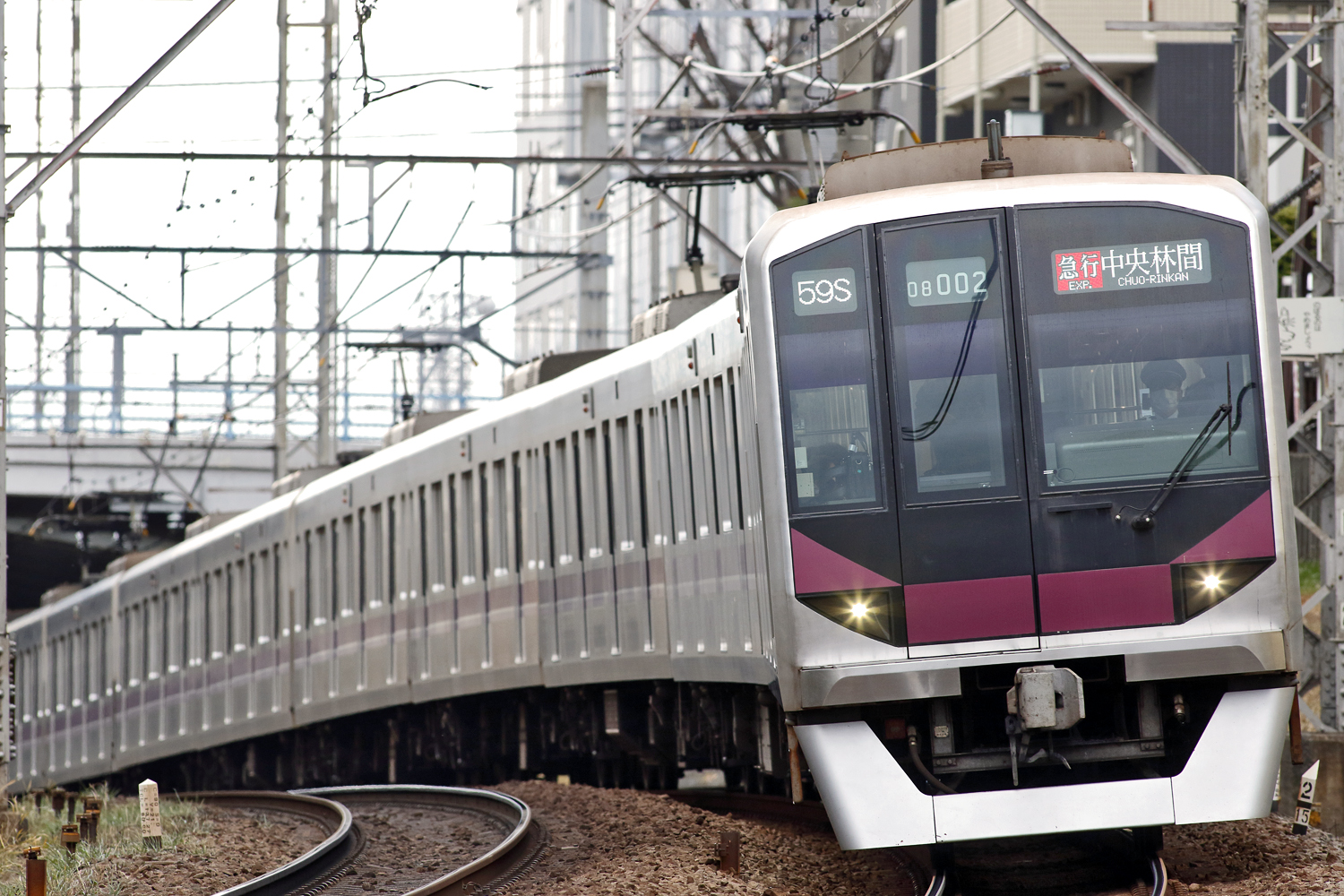
Tokyo Metro 08 series

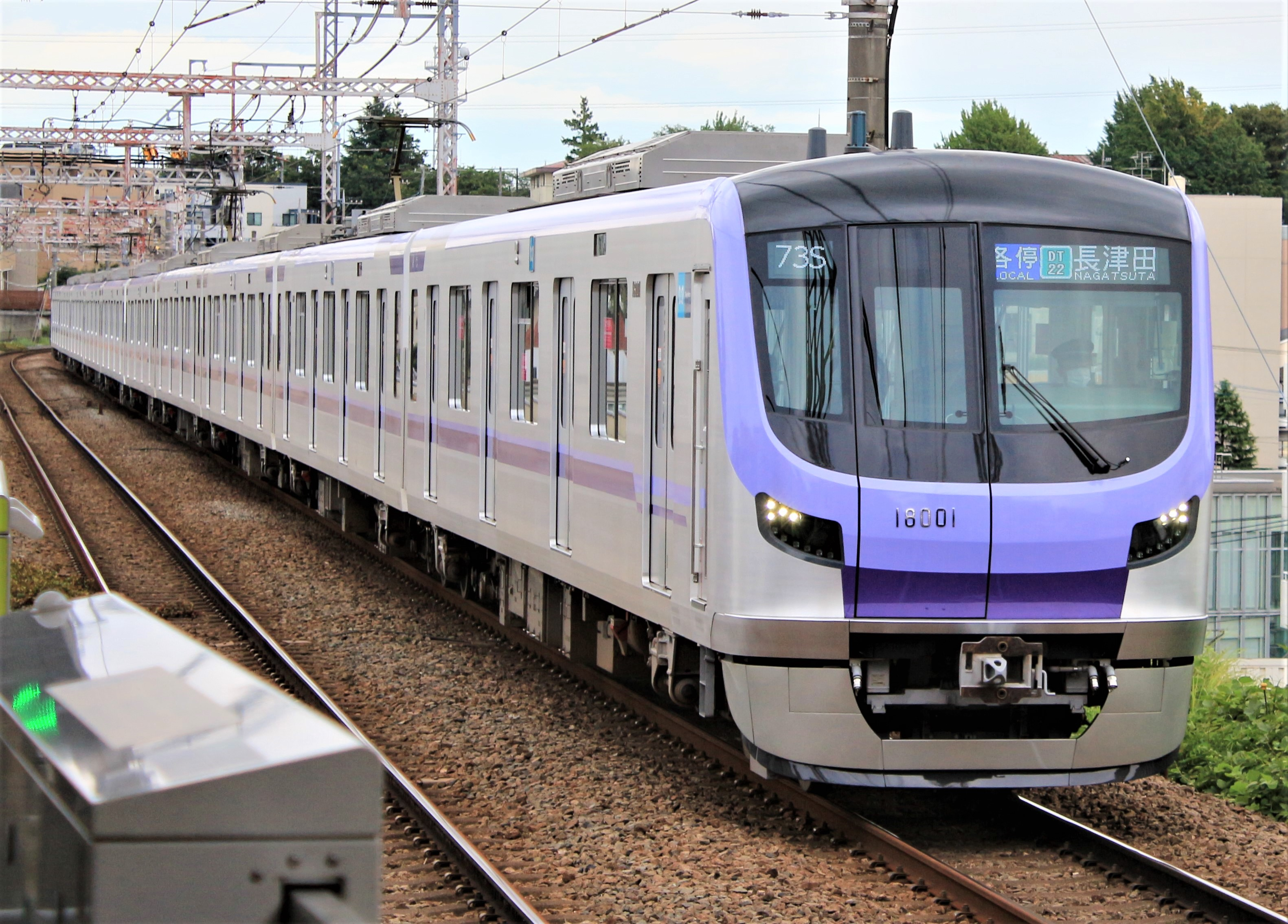
Tokyo Metro 18000 series

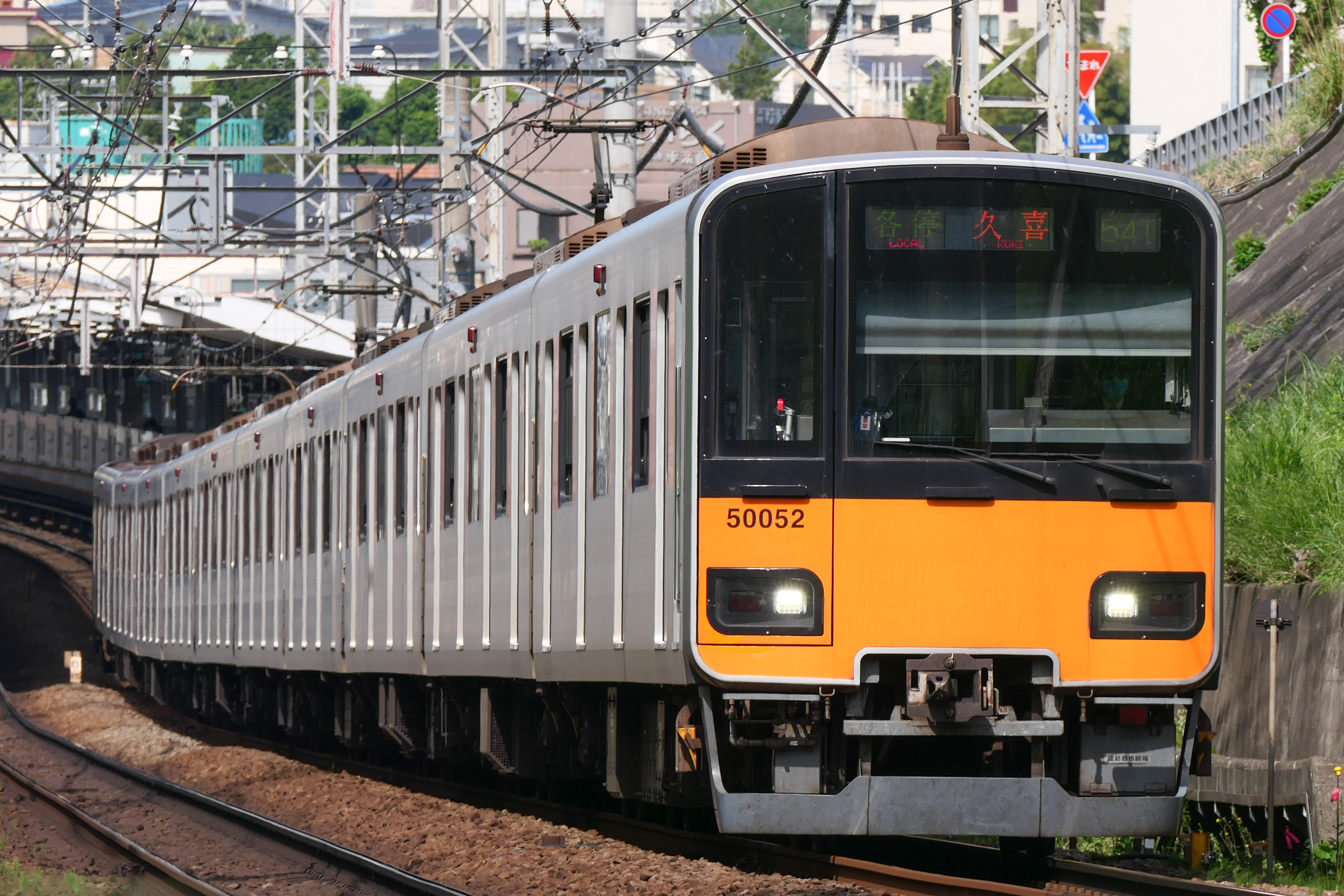
Tobu 50050 series

=== Former ===
- Tobu 30000 series
- Tokyu 2000 series
- Tokyu 8500 series (1975–2023)
- Tokyu 8590 series
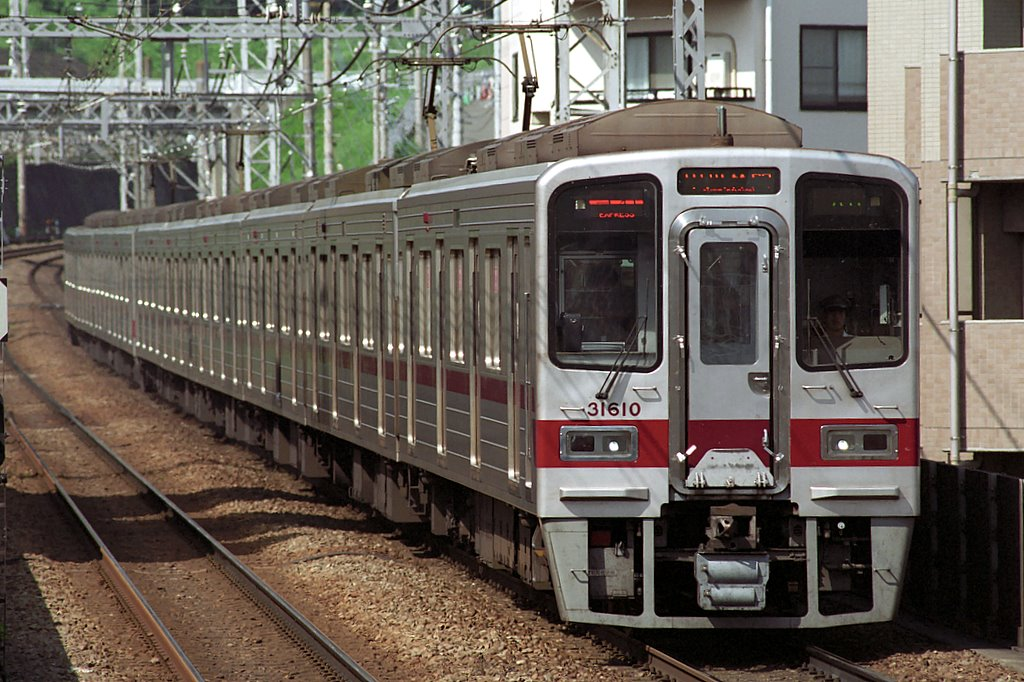
Tobu 30000 series

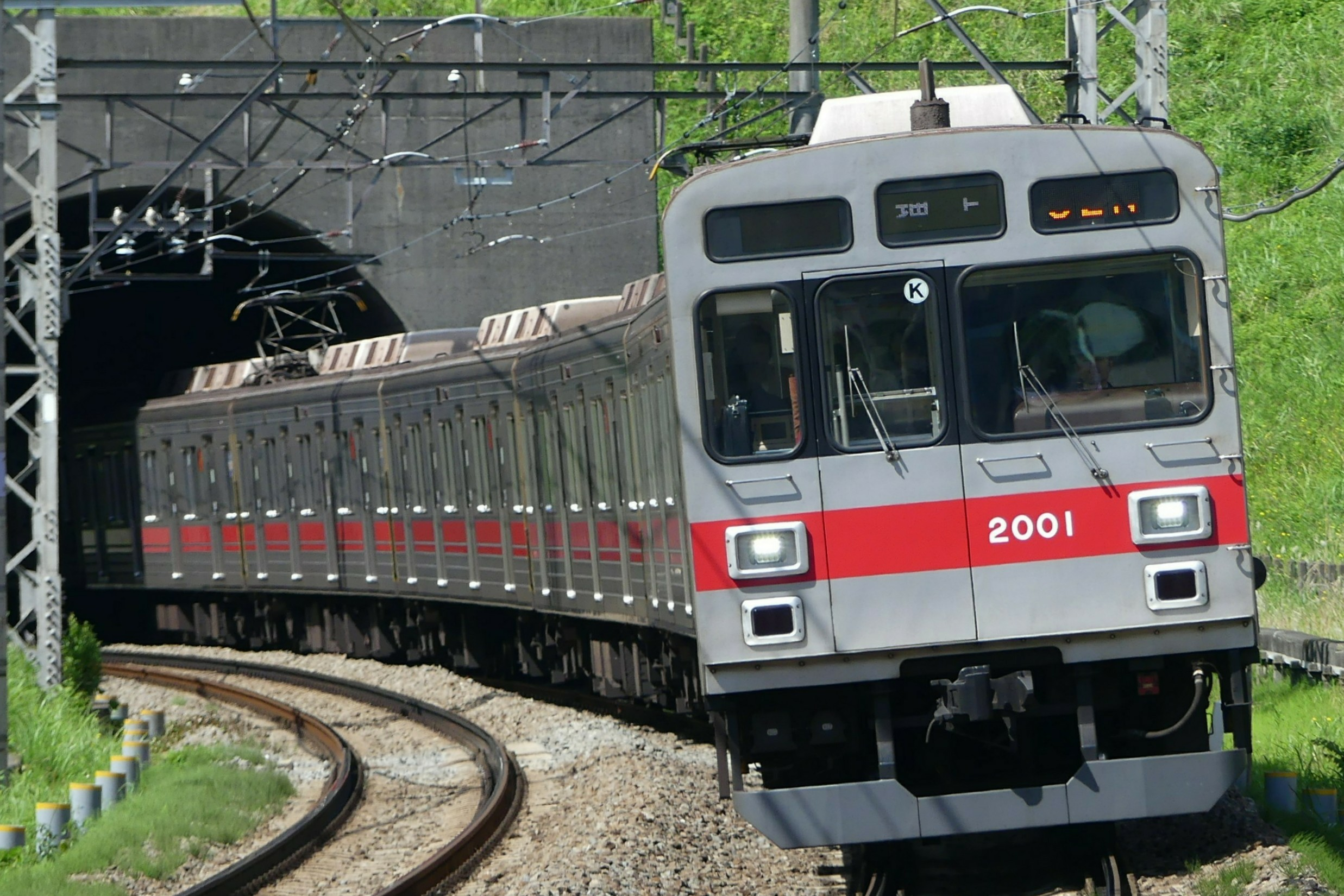
Tokyu 2000 series

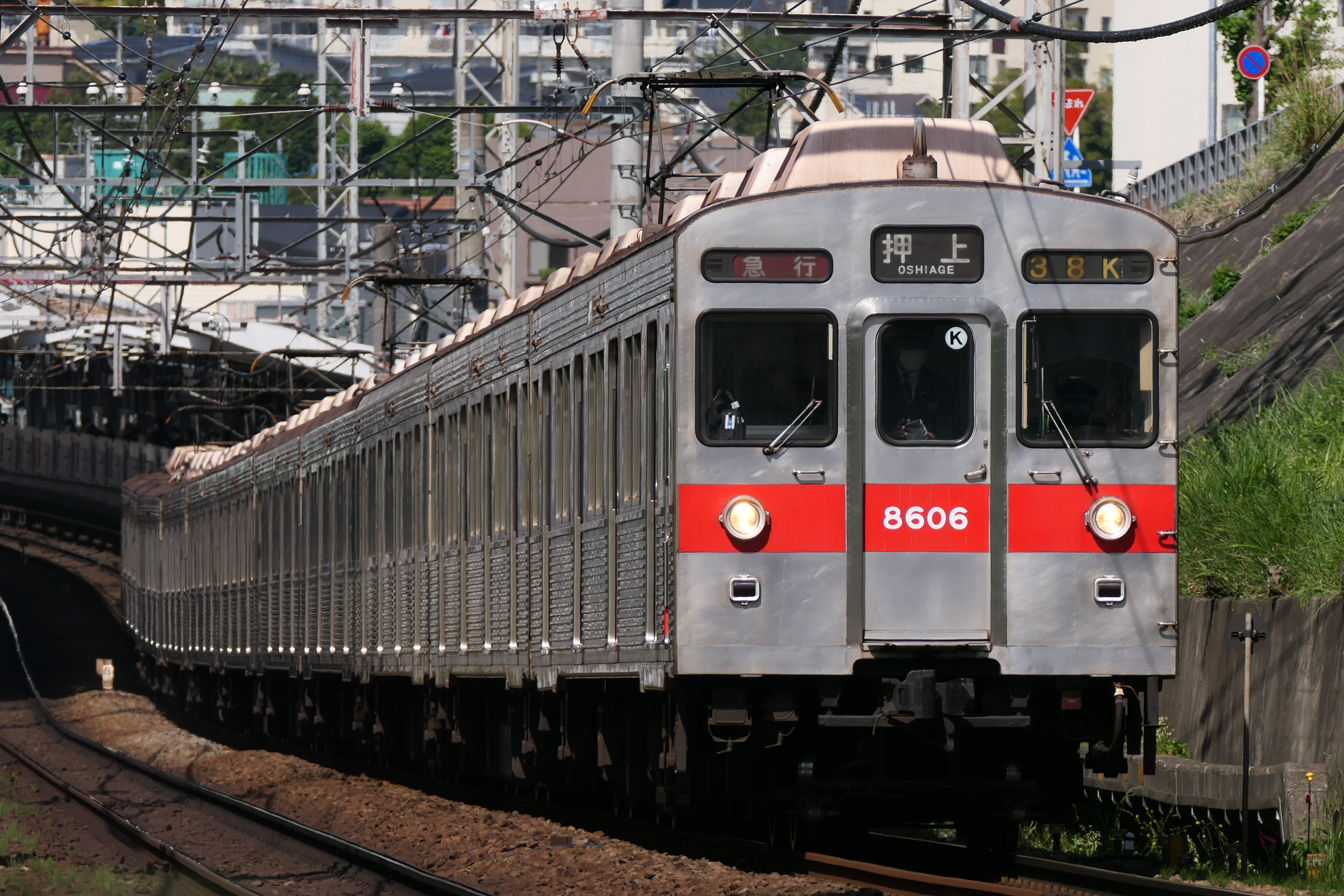
Tokyu 8500 series

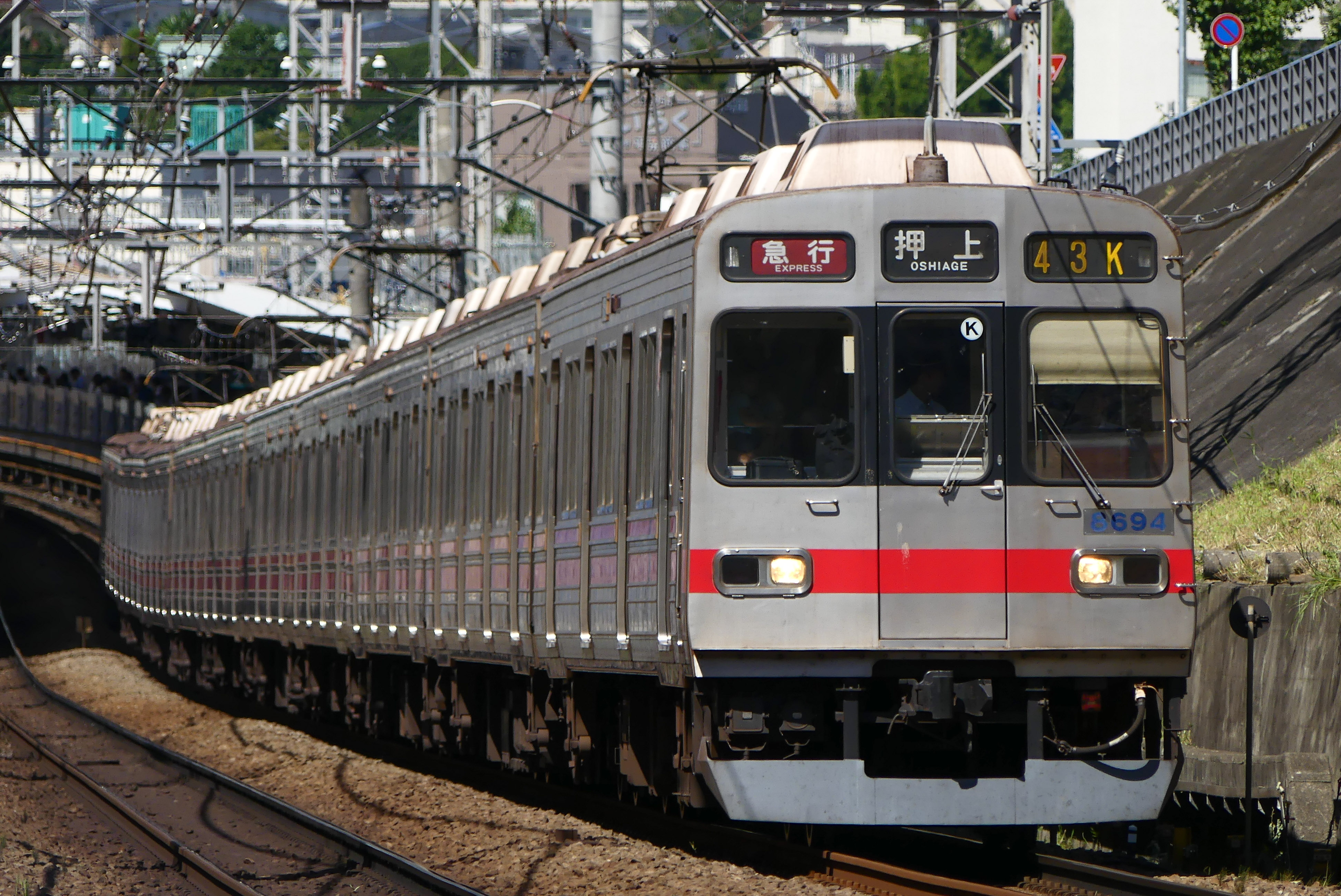
Tokyu 8590 series
