= Chūō-rinkan Station =

Railway station in Yamato, Kanagawa Prefecture, Japan

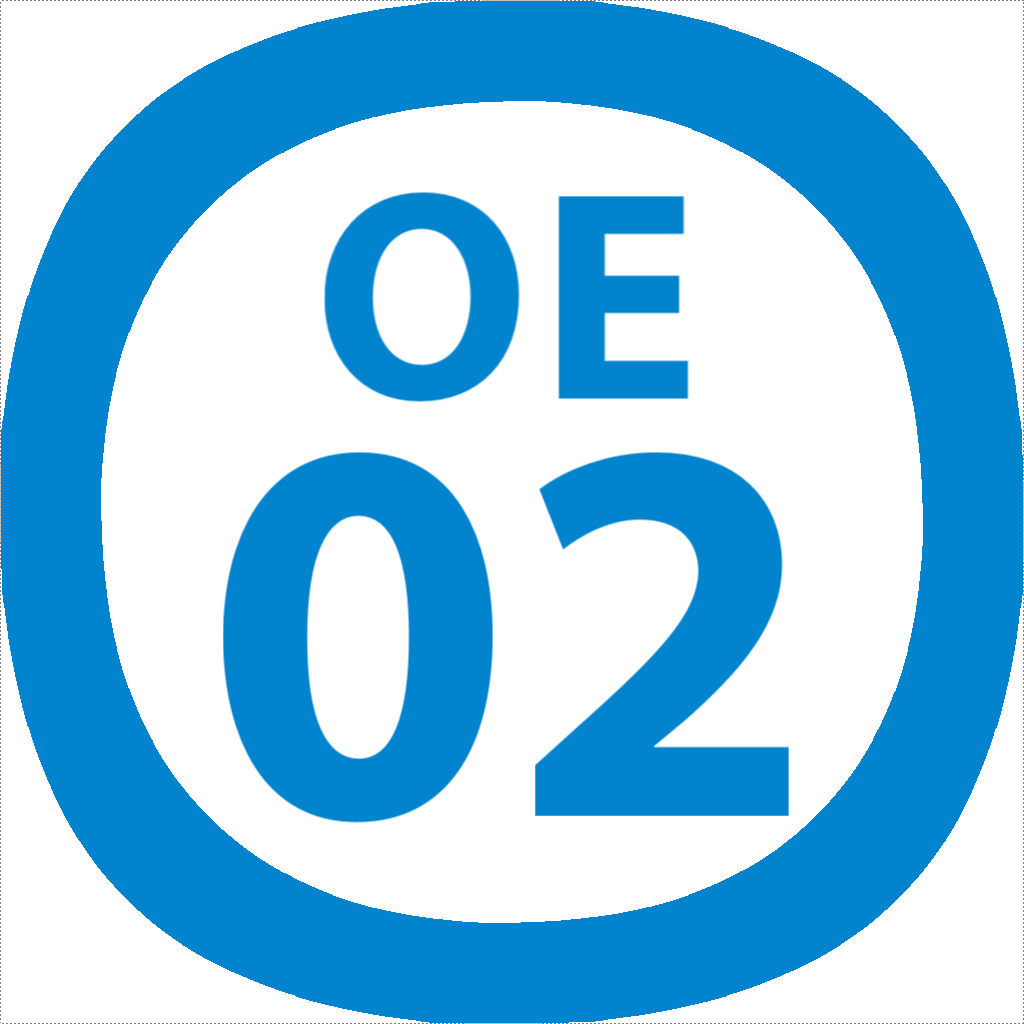
Chūō-rinkan Station 中央林間駅

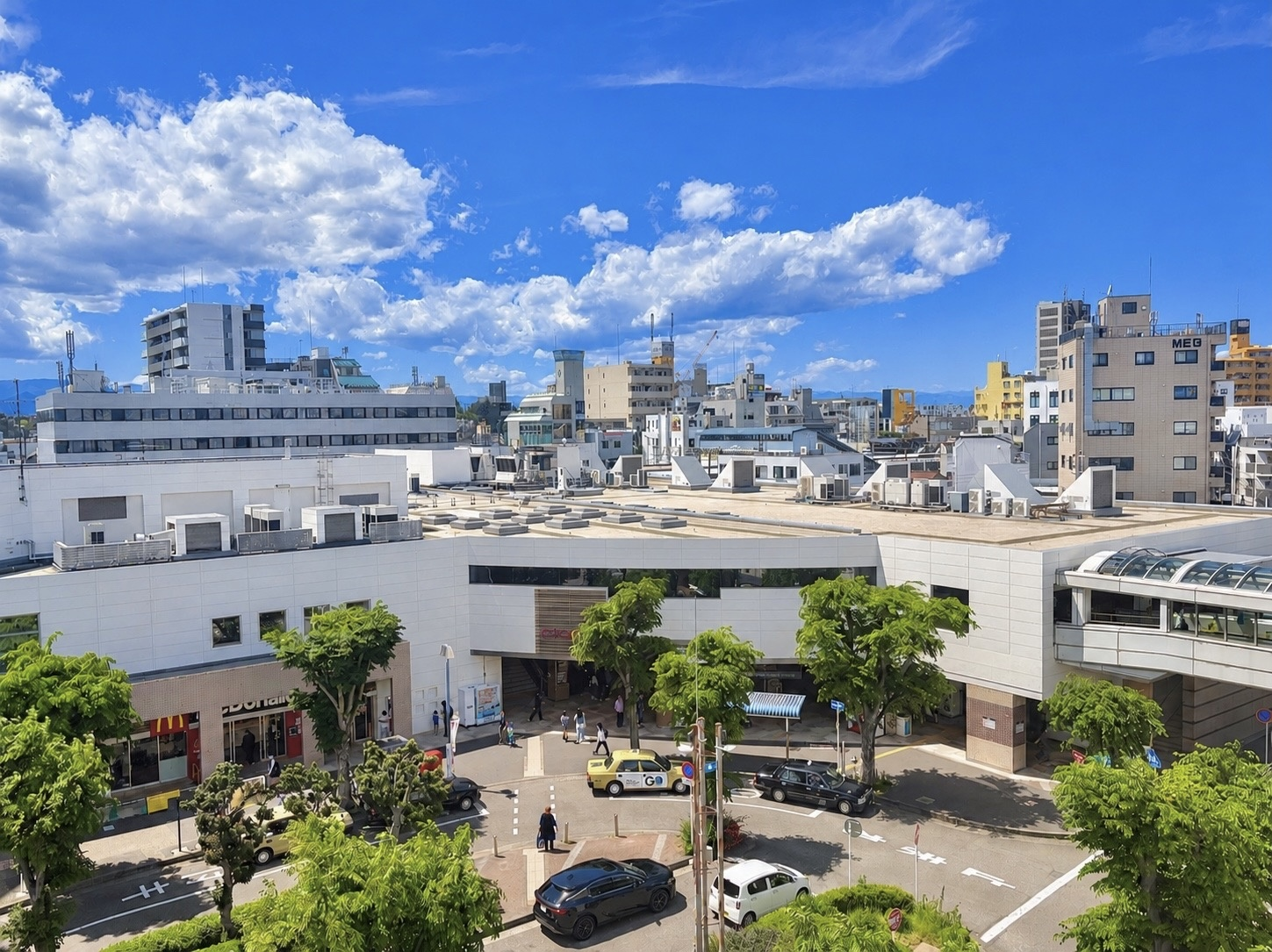
- Chūō-rinkan Station forecourt and taxi stand, 2026

General information
- Location: 3 Chūō-rinkan, Yamato City; Kanagawa Prefecture 242-0007; Japan
- Coordinates: 35.5076185°N 139.4449139°E
- Operator: Tōkyū Railways; Odakyu Electric Railway
- Lines: Den-en-toshi Line; Odakyu Enoshima Line
- Distance: 35.3 km (21.9 mi) from Shinjuku
- Platforms: 1 island + 2 side platforms

Other information
- Station code: DT27 OE-02

History
- Opened: 1 April 1929; 97 years ago
- Former names: Chūō-rinkantoshi (until 1941)

Passengers
- FY2019: 107,086 (Tokyu); 99,122 (Odakyu) daily

Services
Preceding station	Tōkyū Railways	Following station
Terminus	Den-en-toshi Line Express	Minami-machida Grandberry Park towards Shibuya
Terminus	Den-en-toshi Line Semi Express Local	Tsukimino towards Shibuya
Preceding station	Odakyu	Following station
Yamato towards Fujisawa	Enoshima Line Rapid Express	Sagami-Ōno Terminus
Minami-Rinkan towards Katase-Enoshima	Enoshima Line Express	Sagami-Ōno Terminus
Minami-Rinkan towards Katase-Enoshima	Enoshima Line Local	Higashi-Rinkan towards Sagami-Ōno
Location
- Location within Kanagawa Prefecture Location within Japan

Chūō-rinkan Station (中央林間駅, Chūō-rinkan-eki) is an interchange passenger railway station located in the city of Yamato, Kanagawa, Japan. It is operated by the private railway operators Tokyu Corporation and Odakyu Electric Railway.

== Lines ==
Chūō-rinkan Station is served by the Odakyu Enoshima Line and forms the western terminus of the Tōkyū Den-en-toshi Line extending from Shibuya Station (Oshiage Station if including the Hanzomon Line) in Tokyo. It is 35.3 km from the Tokyo terminus of the Odakyu Enoshima Line at Shinjuku Station.

== Station layout ==
The Odakyu portion of the station is above-ground and has two opposed side platforms serving two tracks. The central exit leads to the west end of the station building, and to transfer to the Den-en-toshi Line. There is also a small, unstaffed ticket gate at the north end of the west platform. The Tokyu portion of the stations is underground, and has a single island platform serving two tracks. The ticket gate leads to the east end of the station building and transfer to the Odakyu line. The station consists of two buildings, with a very small, covered, pedestrian street in the middle.

=== Odakyu platforms ===
Odakyu platforms

1	Odakyu Enoshima Line	for Fujisawa and Katase-Enoshima
2	Odakyu Enoshima Line	for Sagami-Ōno, Machida, and Shinjuku

=== Tokyu platforms ===
Tokyu platforms, 2026

1/2	Tōkyū Den-en-toshi Line	for Nagatsuta, Futako-tamagawa and Shibuya; Tokyo Metro Hanzōmon Line for Oshiage; Tobu Skytree Line for Kita-Koshigaya, Kita-Kasukabe and Tōbu-Dōbutsu-Kōen; Tobu Isesaki Line for Kuki; Tōbu Nikkō Line for Minami-kurihashi; Tōkyū Ōimachi Line for Ōimachi

== History ==
The station was originally opened as Chūō-rinkantoshi Station (中央林間都市駅) on April 1, 1929, on the Odakyu Enoshima Line. On October 15, 1941, it was renamed to its present name. The Tokyu Den-en-toshi Line was extended to Chūō-rinkan Station on April 9, 1984.

== Passenger statistics ==
In fiscal 2019, the Odakyu part of the station was used by an average of 99,122 passengers daily. During the same period, the Tōkyū part of the station was used by an average of 107,086 passengers daily.

The passenger figures for previous years are as shown below.

Fiscal year	daily average	
2005	84,104	91,407
2010	89,892	98,235
2015	97,382	105,743

== Surrounding area ==
=== Local transportation ===
- Taxis – there is a taxi stand on the square outside the east side of the station building (near the Denentoshi line ticket gate)
- Other – the Sagami Country Club, a golf club, has a shuttle bus to the golf club, operating regularly from the Odakyu north exit.

== See also ==
- List of railway stations in Japan
