= Futako-tamagawa Station =

Railway station in Tokyo, Japan

Coordinates: 35.611582°N 139.626778°E

Futako-tamagawa Station 二子玉川駅

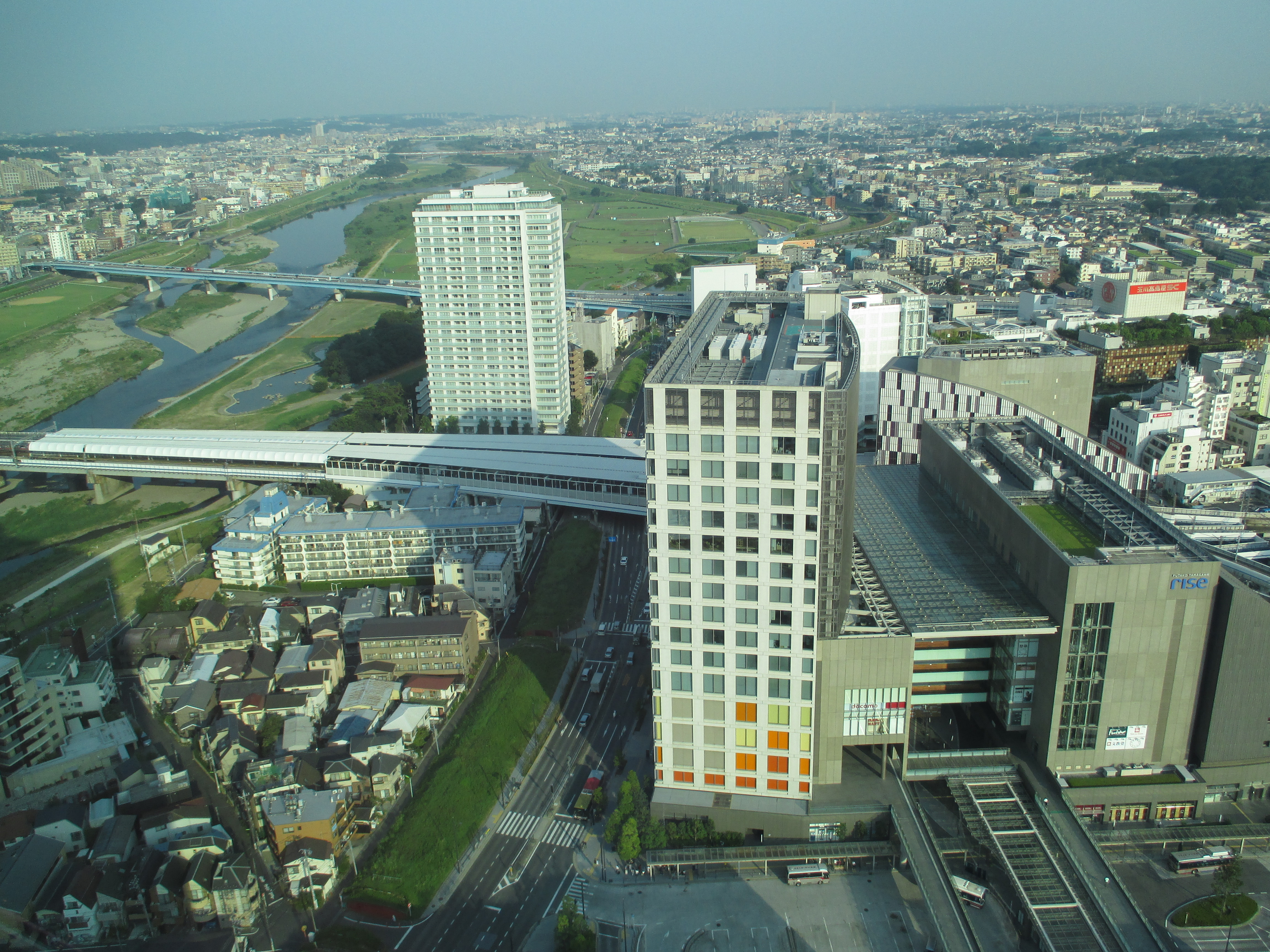
- Futako-tamagawa Station and Futako-Tamagawa Rise

General information
- Location: 2-22-13 Tamagawa, Setagaya, Tokyo （東京都世田谷区玉川2-22-13） Japan
- Operator: Tōkyū Railways
- Lines: Den-en-toshi Line; Ōimachi Line
- Platforms: 2 island platforms
- Tracks: 4
- Connections: Bus terminal

Construction
- Structure type: Elevated

Other information
- Station code: DT-07, OM-15

History
- Opened: 1 April 1907; 119 years ago
- Former names: Tamagawa (玉川); Futako-Tamagawaen (二子玉川園) (until 2000)

Passengers
- 2021: 119,348 daily

Services
Preceding station	Tōkyū Railways	Following station
Mizonokuchi towards Chūō-rinkan	Den-en-toshi Line Express	Sangen-jaya towards Shibuya
Mizonokuchi towards Chūō-rinkan	Den-en-toshi Line Semi-Express	Yōga towards Shibuya
Futako-shinchi towards Chūō-rinkan	Den-en-toshi Line Local	Yōga towards Shibuya
Mizonokuchi Terminus	Ōimachi Line Express	Jiyūgaoka towards Ōimachi
Mizonokuchi Terminus	Ōimachi Line Local	Kaminoge towards Ōimachi
Futako-shinchi towards Mizonokuchi	Ōimachi Line Local	Kaminoge towards Ōimachi
Location
- Location within Special wards of Tokyo Location within Japan

Futako-tamagawa Station (二子玉川駅, Futako-tamagawa-eki) is located in Setagaya, Tokyo, Japan, on the northeast bank of the Tama River. The area surrounding the station is commonly called Futako-tamagawa, and often refers to the Tamagawa and Seta districts of Setagaya, but there is no precise definition. It is colloquially referred to as "Futako" (フタコ) or "Nikotama" (ニコタマ), the latter coming from an alternate reading of the first three kanji characters in the name.

== Lines ==
- Tōkyū Corporation
  - Tōkyū Den-en-toshi Line (DT-07)
  - Tōkyū Ōimachi Line (OM-15)

== Station layout ==
The station is composed of two island platforms.

=== Platforms ===
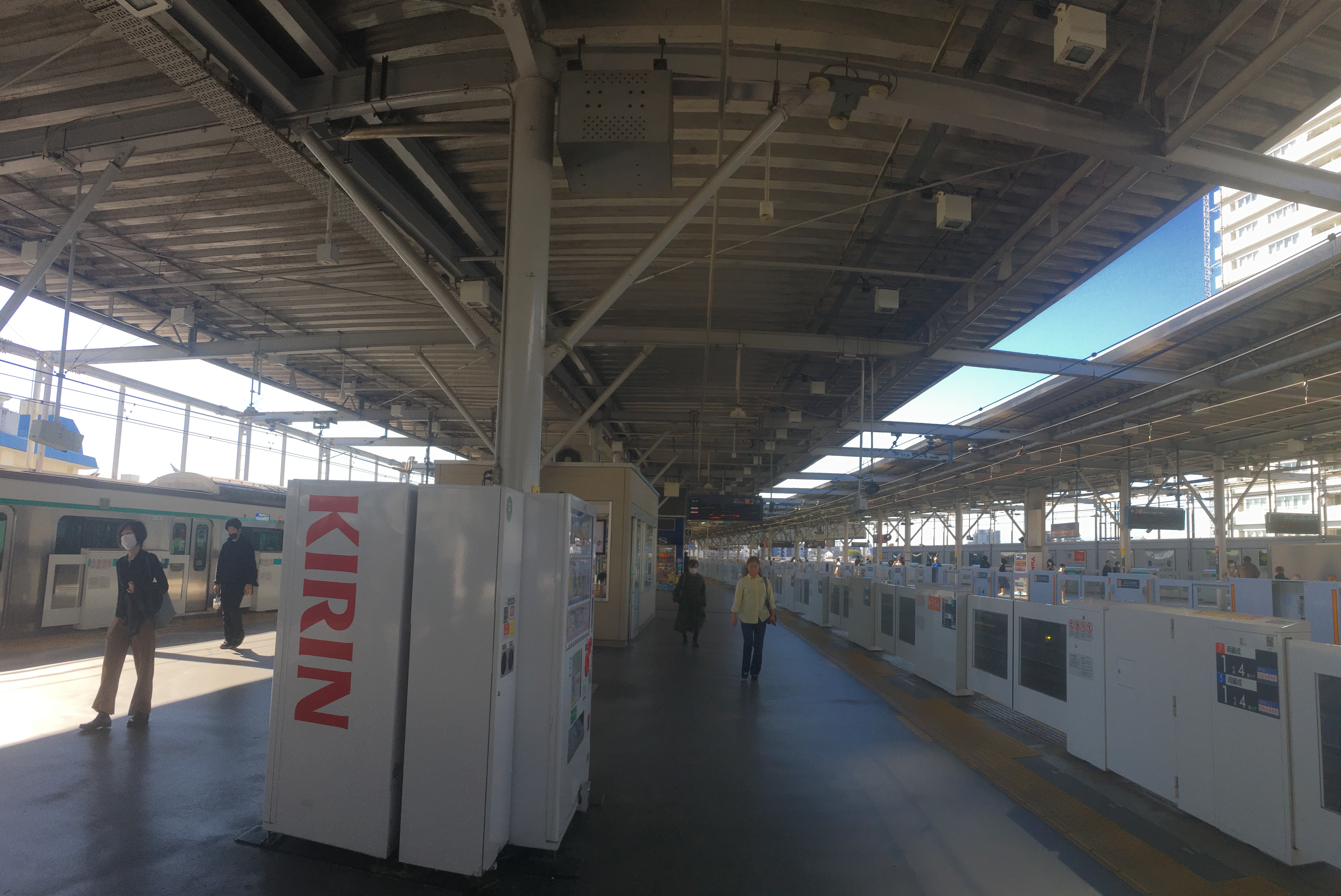
Futako-tamagawa Station platforms, 2021

1	Tokyu Den-en-toshi Line	for Mizonokuchi, Nagatsuta, and Chūō-rinkan
2	Tokyu Oimachi Line	for Mizonokuchi
3	Tokyu Oimachi Line	for Jiyūgaoka, Ōokayama, Hatanodai, and Ōimachi
4	Tokyu Den-en-toshi Line	for Shibuya; Tokyo Metro Hanzomon Line for Oshiage; Tobu Skytree Line for Tōbu-Dōbutsu-Kōen; Tobu Isesaki Line for Kuki; Tobu Nikko Line for Minami-kurihashi

== Surrounding area ==
The east side of Futako-tamagawa Station is mostly occupied by the Futako-Tamagawa Rise complex. The Tamagawa Takashimaya (玉川高島屋) shopping center, located on the west side, is a branch of the Takashimaya department store chain. It opened as Japan's first suburban shopping centre in 1969, and kick-started the development of similar stores around Japan. St. Mary's International School students use this station as a primary way to get to school. Rakuten also has its corporate headquarters adjacent to this station.

- Komazawa University (Futakotamagawa campus)

== History ==
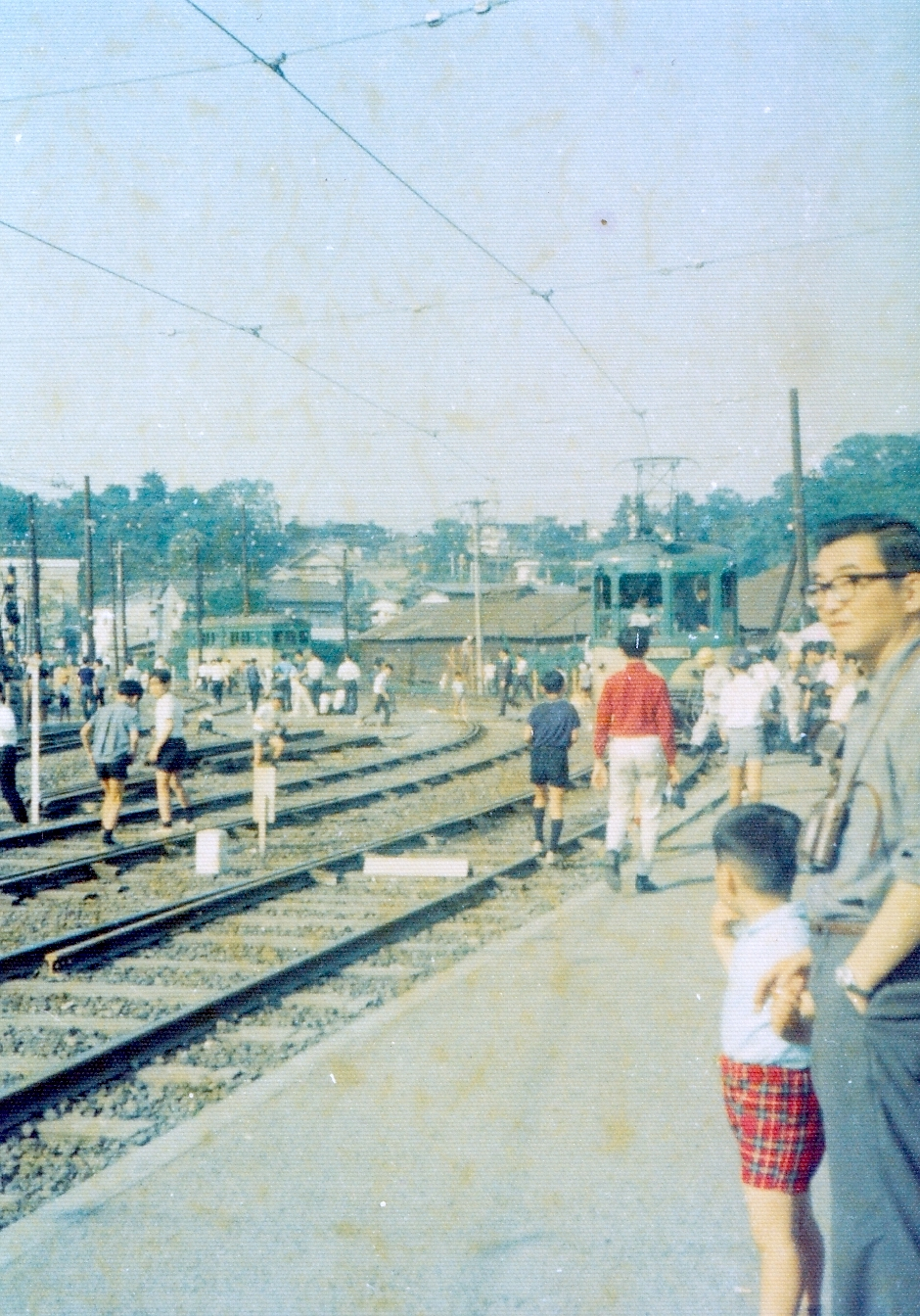
Station platforms in 1969.

The station first opened as Tamagawa Station (玉川駅, Tamagawa-eki) on 1 April 1907, following the beginning of service on the Tamagawa Line (玉川線, Tamagawa-sen) tram. On 1 March 1924, the station was also connected to the Kinuta Line (砧線, Kinuta-sen) tram. On 15 July 1926, the Mizonokuchi Line (溝ノ口線, Mizonokuchi-sen) opened between Tamagawa Station and Mizonokuchi Station. On 1 November 1929, the Futako-tamagawa Line (二子玉川線, Futako-tamagawa-sen) opened, coinciding with the opening of Futako-tamagawa Station (二子玉川駅, Futako-tamagawa-eki). This line would be incorporated into the Oimachi Line on 25 December 1929. On 10 March 1939, Tamagawa Station was renamed to Yomiuri-Yuen Station (よみうり遊園駅, Yomiuri-Yuen-eki). This station would be integrated with Futako-tamagawa Station on 1 December 1940, becoming Futako-Yomiurien Station (二子読売園駅, Futako-Yomiurien-eki). On 1 July 1943, the Mizonokuchi Line was integrated into the Oimachi Line. On 20 October 1944, Futako-Yomiurien Station was renamed to Futako-tamagawa Station. On 1 August 1954, Futako-tamagawa Station was renamed to Futako-tamagawaen Station (二子玉川園駅, Futako-tamagawaen-eki). On 11 October 1983, the Oimachi Line was renamed to the Den-en-toshi Line. This line was different from the modern day Den-en-toshi Line. On 10 March 1969, the Tamagawa and Kinuta tram lines were abolished. On 7 April 1977, the Shin-tamagawa Line (新玉川線, Shin-tamagawa-sen) began service. The name Oimachi Line was revived on 12 August 1979 for its modern usage. On 6 August 2000, the Shin-tamagawa Line was renamed to the Den-en-toshi Line, which remains to this day. At the same time, Futako-tamagawaen Station was renamed back to Futako-tamagawa Station.
