= TWR 70-000 series =

Japanese train type

Tokyo Waterfront Area Rapid Transit 70-000 series
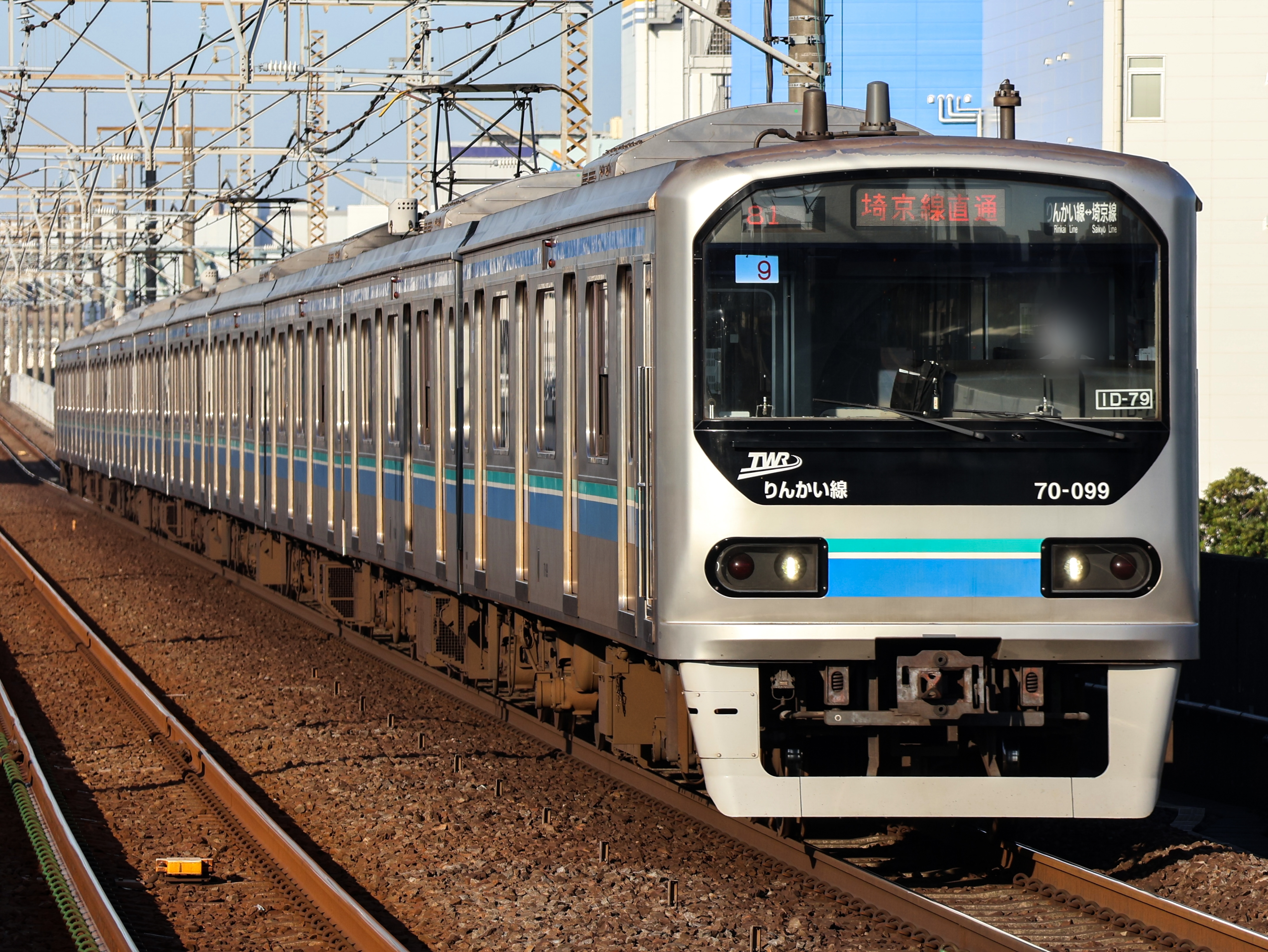
- Set Z9 in May 2024
- In service: 1996–present
- Manufacturer: Kawasaki Heavy Industries
- Constructed: 1995–2004
- Refurbished: 2011–2018
- Number built: 86 vehicles
- Number in service: 80 vehicles (8 sets) (+6 vehicles converted to 209-3100 series)
- Successor: TWR 71-000 series
- Formation: 10 cars per trainset
- Fleet numbers: Z1–3, Z6–10
- Operators: Tokyo Waterfront Area Rapid Transit; Future (as 307 series): JR Kyushu
- Depot: Yashio Depot
- Lines served: Rinkai Line; Saikyō Line; ■ Kawagoe Line; Future (as 307 series): Chikuhi Line

Specifications
- Car body construction: Stainless steel
- Train length: 200.84 m (658 ft 11 in)
- Car length: 20.42 m (67 ft 0 in) (end cars); 20 m (65 ft 7 in) (intermediate cars)
- Width: 2.8 m (9 ft 2 in)
- Height: 4,067 mm (13 ft 4.1 in)
- Doors: Sliding, 4 pairs per side
- Maximum speed: 110 km/h (68 mph)
- Electric systems: 1,500 V DC overhead catenary
- Current collection: Pantograph
- Safety systems: ATS-P, ATC
- Track gauge: 1,067 mm (3 ft 6 in)

The Tokyo Waterfront Area Rapid Transit 70-000 series (東京臨海高速鉄道70-000形) is a DC commuter electric multiple unit (EMU) train type operated in the Tokyo area of Japan by the Tokyo Waterfront Area Rapid Transit. The train was built by Kawasaki Heavy Industries and first entered revenue service in 1996. Its design is based on the 209 series.

== Formations ==
As of 1 April 2011, eight 10-car sets, numbered Z1 to Z3 and Z6 to Z10, are based at Yashio Depot in Tokyo (accessed via a spur located between Tennōzu Isle Station and Tokyo Teleport Station). These sets are formed as follows with six motored ("M") cars and four non-powered trailer ("T") cars.

	← Shin-Kiba Ōsaki, Ōmiya, Kawagoe →									
Car No.	10	9	8	7	6	5	4	3	2	1
Designation	Tc2A	M1A	M2A	T2A	M1A	M2B	T2A	M1A	M2A	Tc2B
Numbering	70-xx0	70-xx1	70-xx2	70-xx3	70-xx4	70-xx5	70-xx6	70-xx7	70-xx8	70-xx9

- Cars 3, 6, and 9 are each fitted with one lozenge-type pantograph.
- Cars 1 and 10 have wheelchair space.
- Car 4 is designated as a mildly air-conditioned car.

== History ==
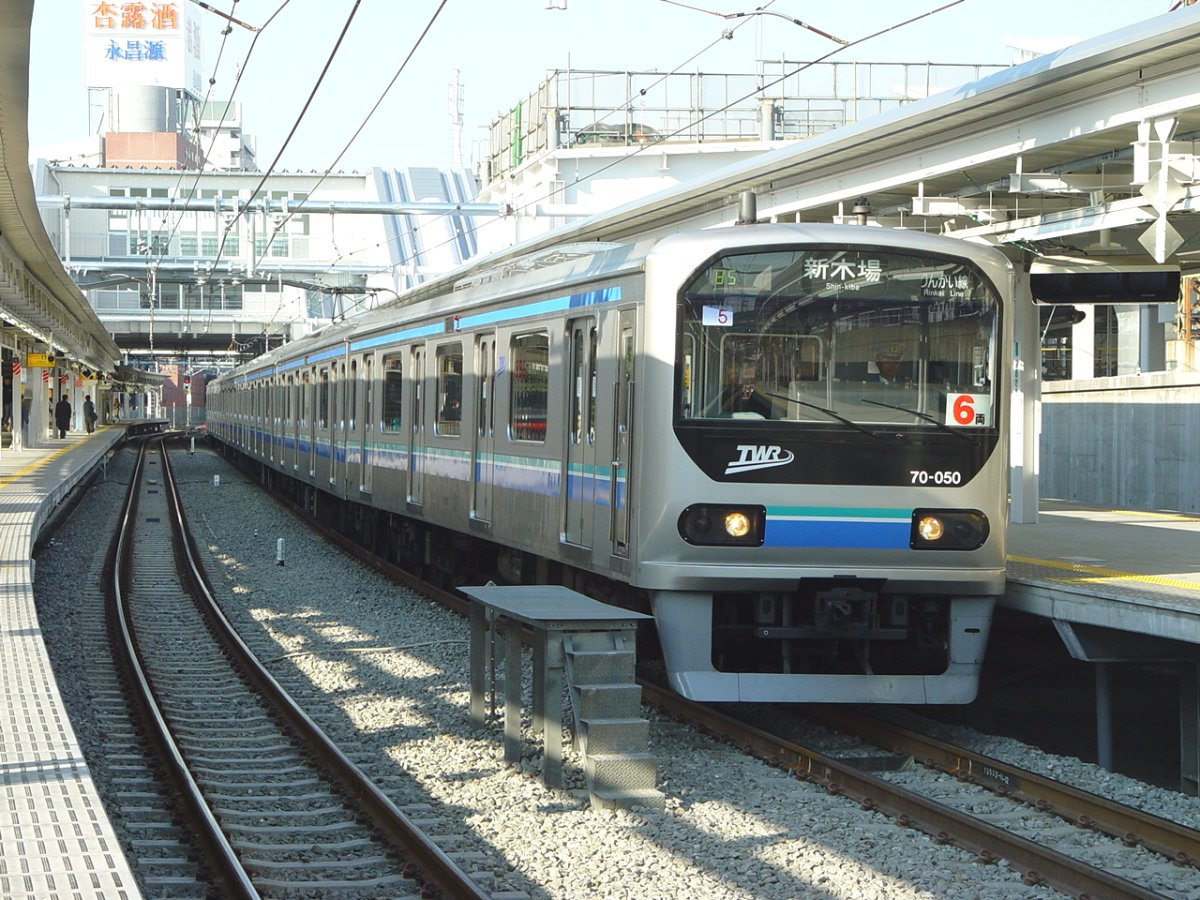
6-car 70-000 series set in December 2002

Four 4-car trains were originally built and entered service in 1996 when the Rinkai Line opened between Shin-Kiba and Tokyo Teleport. A fifth train was built in 1999 for service expansion, and a sixth was built in 2001 for the extension of the line to Tennōzu Isle. In 2002, for the opening of the entire line to Ōsaki, the first five trains were extended to 6 cars, the sixth train was extended to 10 cars, and four new 10-car trains were built, for a total of five 6-car and five 10-car trains. The 10-car trains were also used on through services to/from the JR Saikyō Line.

From October 2004, the five 6-car trains were reformed as three 10-car trains. Six new trailer cars were built for the conversion, while six surplus cab and motor cars were sold to JR East to create 209-3100 series EMUs used on the Hachikō Line and Kawagoe Line.

=== 209-3100 series conversions ===
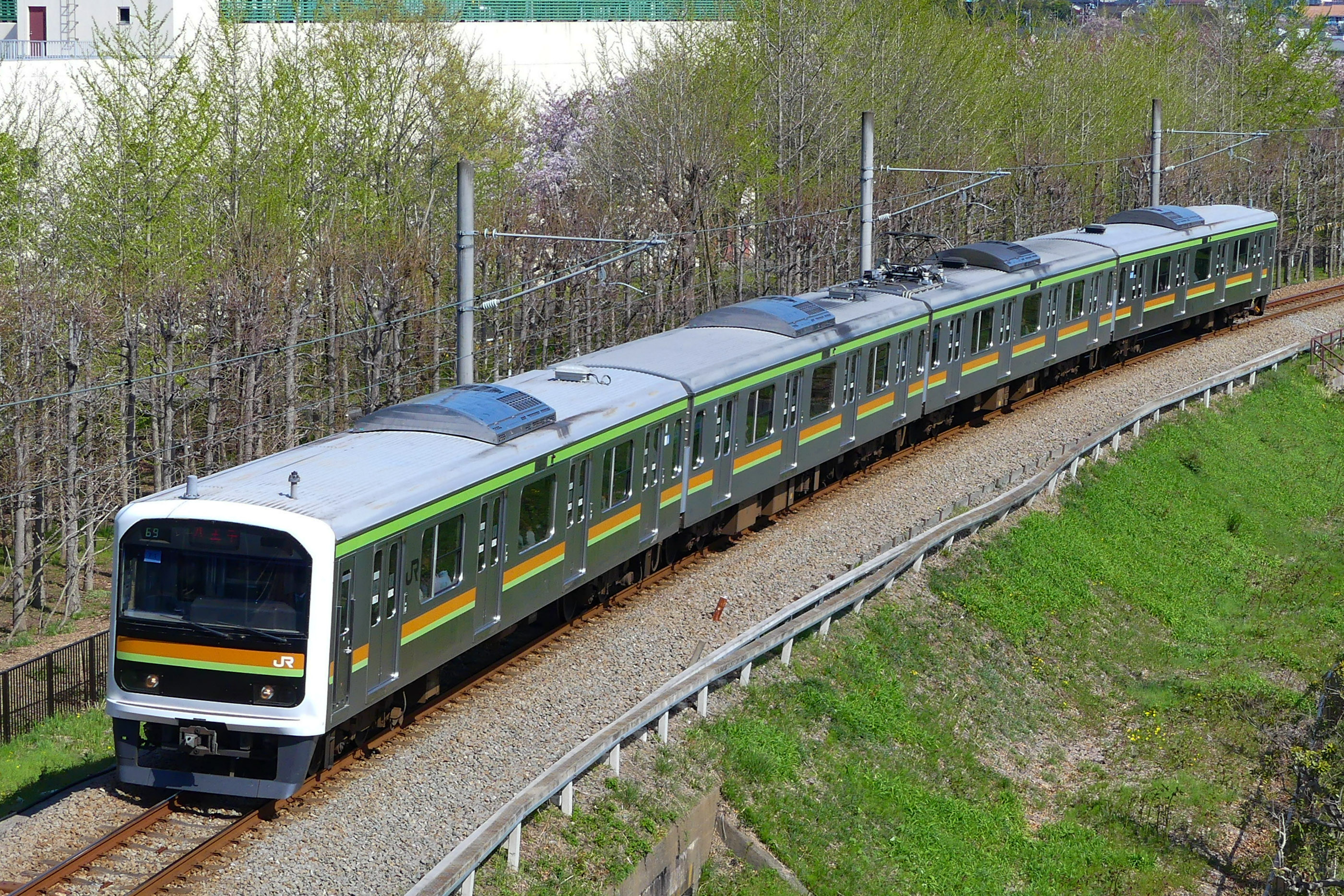
JR East 209-3100 series, April 2017

Six former 70-000 series cars were converted in 2004 and 2005 to become 209-3100 series EMUs for use by JR East. The subsequent identities of these cars are as shown below. (The former car numbers were reused when other spare cars were renumbered.)

Former car number	New car number	New set number	Date returned to service
70-020	KuHa 209-3101	71	14 March 2005
70-027	MoHa 209-3102	72	16 December 2004
70-028	MoHa 208-3102	72	16 December 2004
70-029	KuHa 208-3101	71	14 March 2005
70-030	KuHa 209-3102	72	16 December 2004
70-039	KuHa 209-3102	72	16 December 2004

=== Future plans ===
The fleet of 70-000 series was expected to be replaced by a new train type in 2024. The design concept for its successor, the 71-000 series, was unveiled on 6 November 2023. The new trains, however, entered revenue service in October 2025; the full fleet of eight sets is expected to be in service by fiscal 2027.

=== Transfer to JR Kyushu ===
In June 2025, it was announced that some 70‑000 series sets would be transferred to JR Kyushu to replace life-expired 103 series trains on the Chikuhi Line.

JR Kyushu later announced on 25 June 2026 that the converted 70-000 series sets would be reclassified as the 307 series (307系). A total of five two-car sets are planned to undergo the conversion.
