= Tennōzu Isle =

Island near Tokyo, Japan

Coordinates: 35.6232°N 139.7505°E

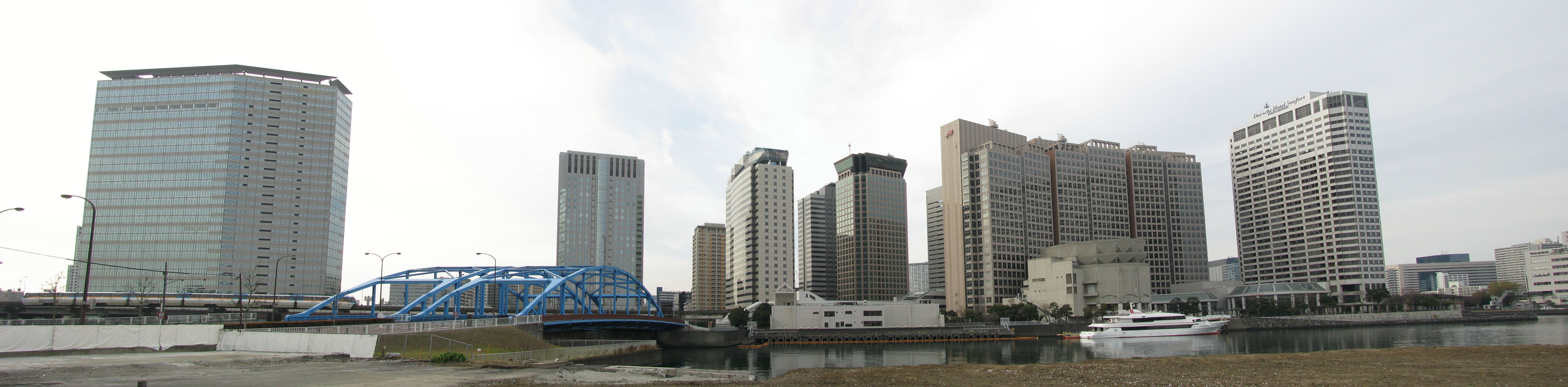
Tennōzu Isle

Tennōzu Isle (天王洲アイル, Tennōzu-Airu) is an area surrounding Shinagawa, Tokyo, Japan. It is a waterfront district known for its various leisure attractions and piers.

== History ==
Tennōzu Isle was built on reclaimed land. It is named after Gozu Tennō, whose mask was brought up from the sea near this area. Tennōzu Isle was originally created as a fort to protect Shinagawa from naval invasions, but was redeveloped into a district with many warehouses. Some of these warehouses remain in operation today.

== Transportation ==
- Tennōzu Isle Station
  - Tokyo Monorail
  - Rinkai Line
