= Ōimachi =

Ōimachi may refer to:

- Tōkyū Ōimachi Line, a railway line between Kawasaki and Tokyo in Japan.
- Ōimachi Station, a station on the said railway line.
