= Ōimachi Station =

Railway station in Tokyo, Japan

JK19 R07 Ōimachi Station 大井町駅

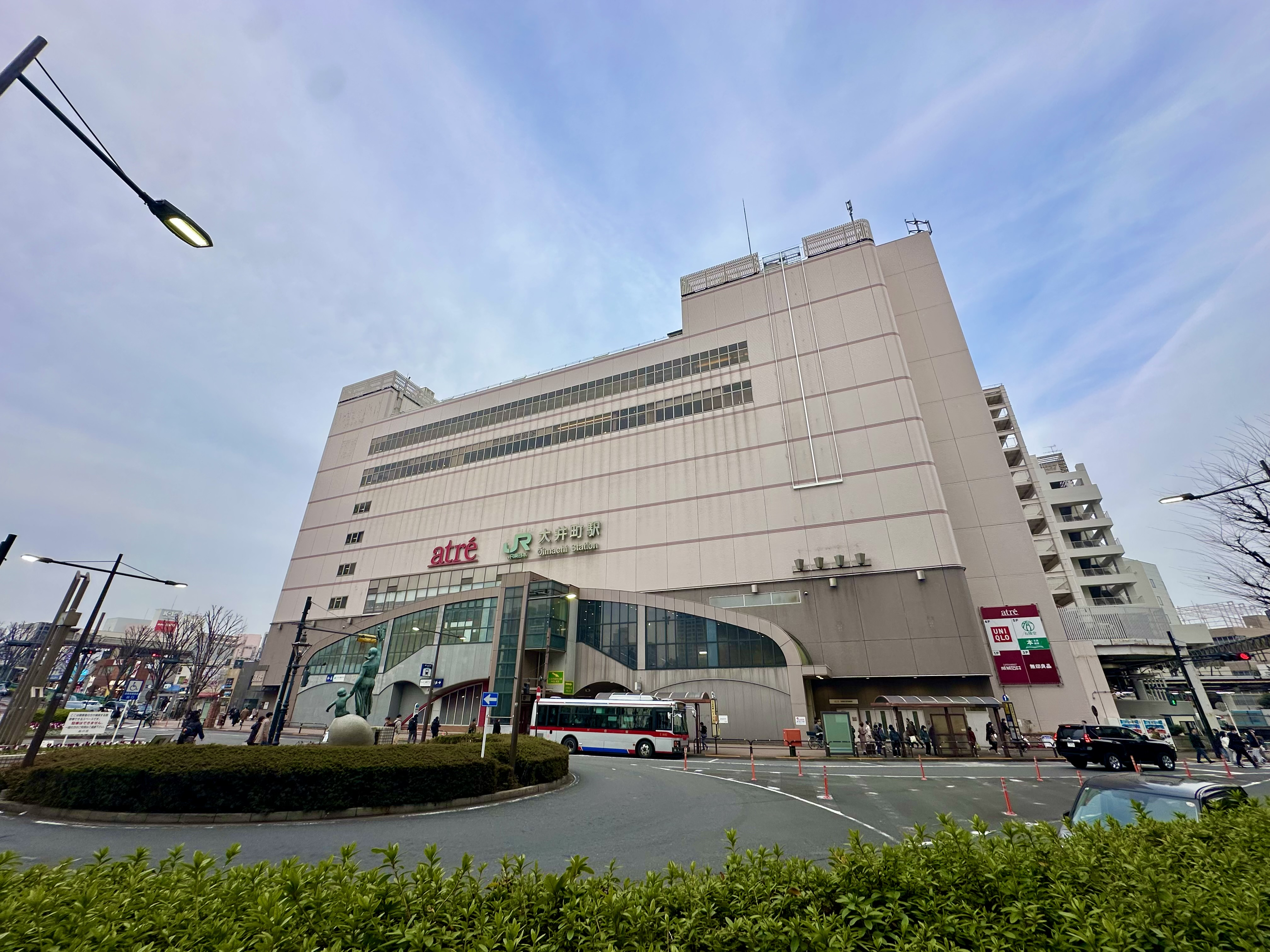
- Ōimachi station Central Exit

General information
- Location: Shinagawa City, Tokyo; Japan
- Coordinates: 35°36′24″N 139°44′05″E
- Operator: East Japan Railway Company; Tōkyū Railways; Tokyo Waterfront Area Rapid Transit
- Lines: Keihin-Tohoku Line; Ōimachi Line; Rinkai Line
- Distance: 39.5 km (24.5 mi) from Ōmiya; 12.4 km (7.7 mi) from Mizonokuchi; 10.5 km (6.5 mi) from Shin-Kiba

Other information
- Station code: JK19; OM01; R07

History
- Opened: 1914

Passengers
- FY2024: 88,152 daily (JR East)
- FY2024: 36,545 daily (TWR)
- Rank: 2 of 8 (TWR)

Services
Preceding station	JR East	Following station
Ōmori JK18 towards Yokohama	Keihin–Tōhoku Line Rapid Local	Shinagawa towards Ōmiya
Preceding station	Tōkyū Railways	Following station
Hatanodai towards Mizonokuchi	Ōimachi Line Express	Terminus
Shimo-shimmei towards Mizonokuchi	Ōimachi Line Local Local	Terminus
Preceding station	Tokyo Waterfront Area Rapid Transit	Following station
Ōsaki R08 Terminus	Rinkai Line	Shinagawa Seaside R06 towards Shin-Kiba
Location
- Location within Tokyo wards area Location within Japan

Ōimachi Station (Japanese: 大井町駅, Hepburn: Ōimachi-eki) is an interchange railway station in Shinagawa, Tokyo, Japan, operated by East Japan Railway Company (JR East), Tokyo Waterfront Area Rapid Transit (TWR), and the private railway operator Tokyu Corporation.

== Lines ==
Ōimachi Station is served by the following lines:

- JR East Keihin-Tohoku Line
- TWR Rinkai Line
- Tokyu Oimachi Line

== Station layout ==
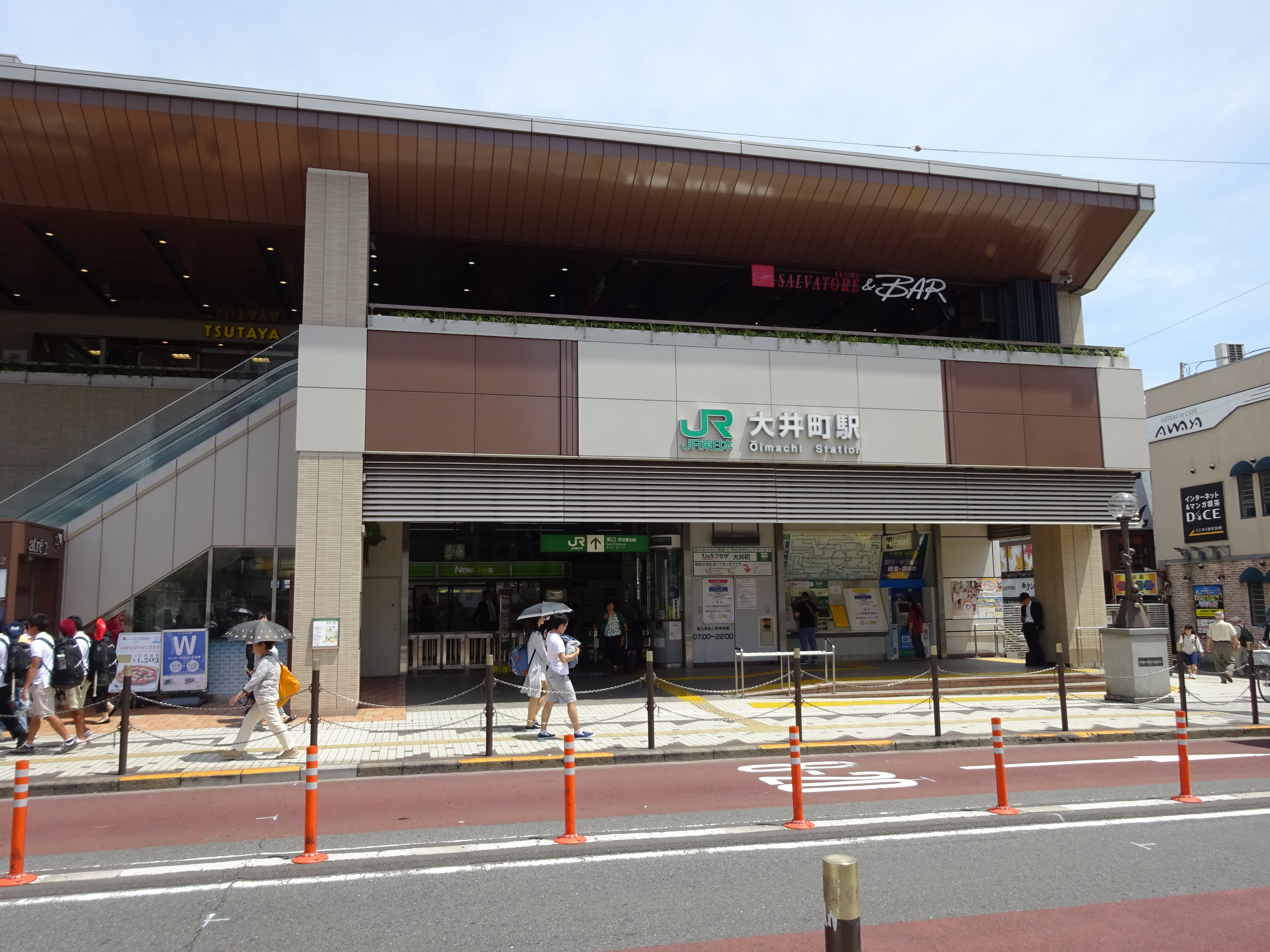
Ōimachi Station West Exit in June, 2016

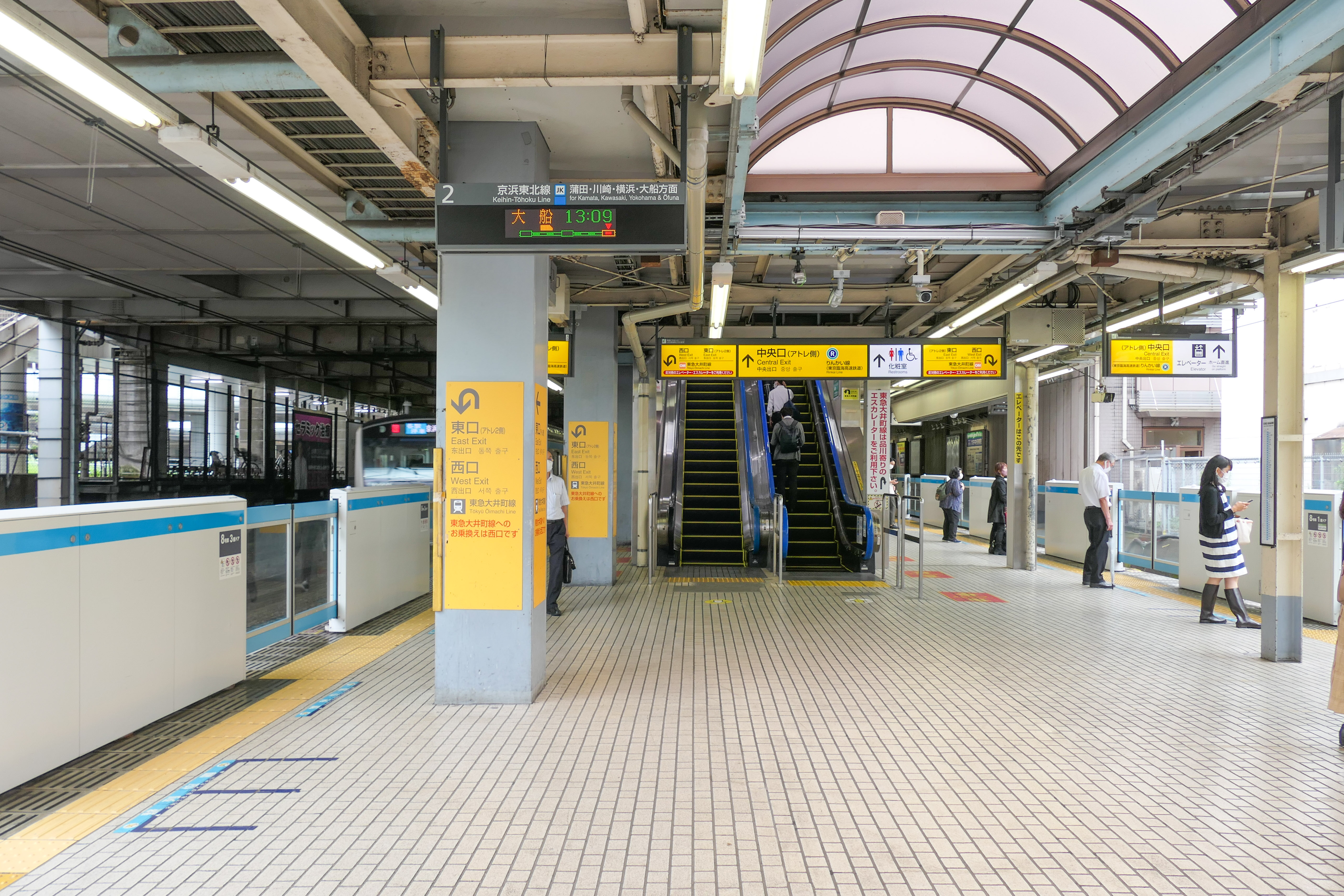
The Keihin-Tohoku Line platforms in July, 2021

=== JR platforms ===
1	Keihin-Tohoku Line	for Tokyo, Ueno, Akabane and Ōmiya
2	Keihin-Tohoku Line	for Kawasaki, Yokohama, and Negishi Line for Ōfuna

=== Tokyu platforms ===
1,2	Tokyu Oimachi Line	for Ōokayama, Jiyūgaoka, Futako-tamagawa, and Mizonokuchi

The Tokyu Oimachi Line platforms are scheduled to be lengthened to handle seven-car trains on express services during fiscal 2017.

=== TWR platforms ===
1	Rinkai Line・Saikyo Line	for Ōsaki, Shinjuku, Akabane and Ōmiya
2	Rinkai Line	for Tokyo Teleport and Shin-Kiba

Chest-height platform edge doors are scheduled to be installed on the TWR platform during fiscal 2019.

== Passenger statistics ==
In fiscal 2013, the JR East station was used by an average of 100,403 passengers daily (boarding passengers only), making it the 38th-busiest station operated by JR East. Over the same fiscal year, the TWR station was used by an average of 38,133 people daily (boarding passengers only). In fiscal 2013, the Tokyu station was used by an average of 137,025 people daily (entering and exiting passengers), making it the busiest station on the Oimachi Line. The average daily passenger figures for previous years are as shown below.

Fiscal year	JR East	TWR	Tokyu
2000	78,996		
2005	86,298		106,157
2010	94,715		126,395
2011	95,225	33,124	127,424
2012	97,865	36,554	132,564
2013	100,403	38,133	137,025
2014		39,749	

- Note that the JR East and TWR statistics are for boarding passengers only.

== History ==
Station numbering was introduced to the Rinkai Line platforms in 2016 with Ōimachi being assigned station number R07.

== Surrounding area ==
- Yamada Denki-Shinagawa Kyurian Hall
- JR Tokyo General Rolling Stock Center
- The Shiki Theatre Natsu
- Atré Shopping Centre
- Hankyu Oimachi Garden
- Shinagawa Ward Office
- Shinagawa Post Office
- Brillia Oi-machi La Vie En Towner
- Ebara Shichi-Fuku-Jin (Seven Lucky Gods in Ebara area)
  - Oi zao gongen jinja shrine
- Sendai miso Brewery
- Zēmusu-saka
- Old Sendai slope (Slope of darkness)
- Ohuro no Osama
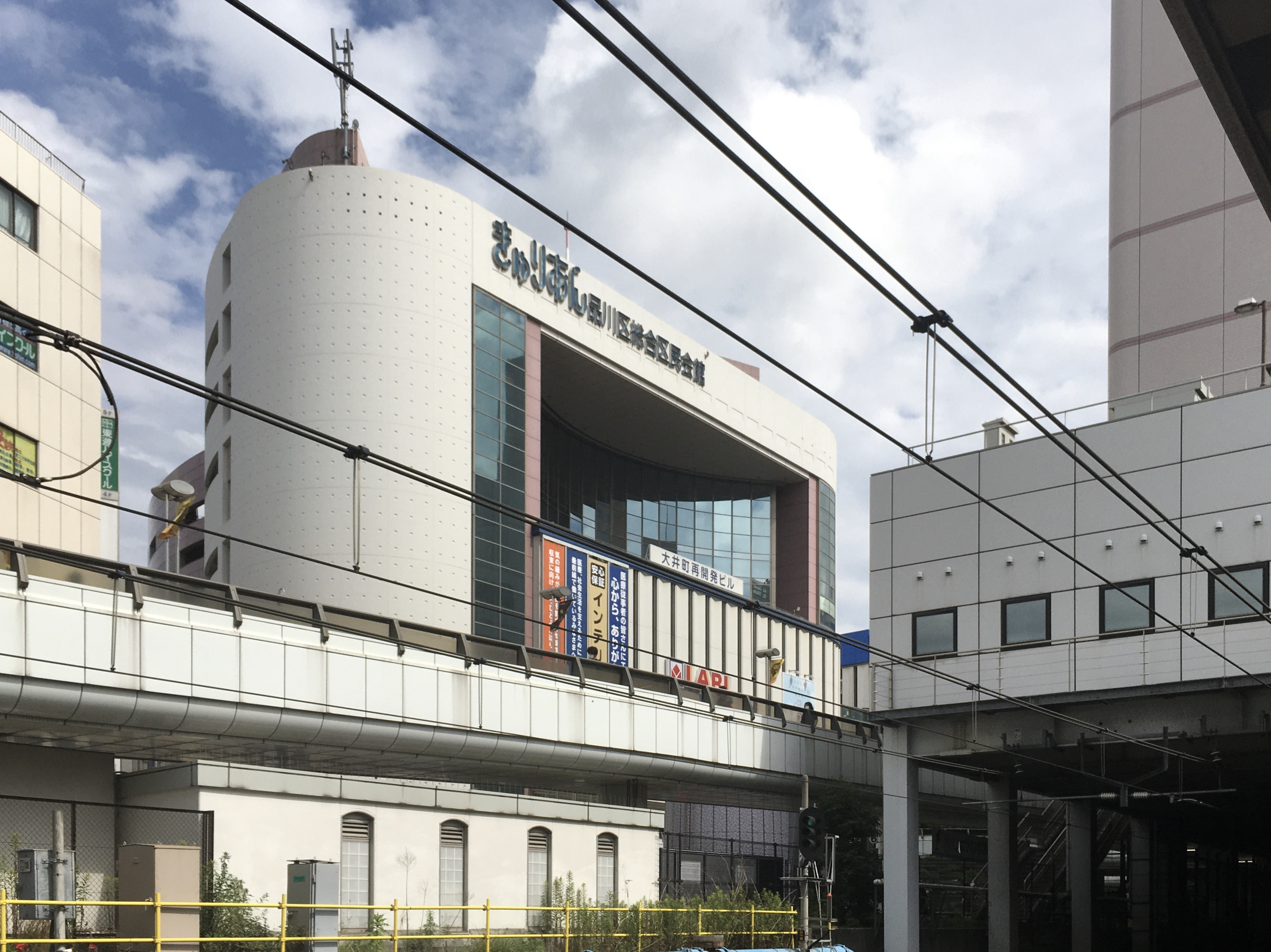
Yamada Denki-Shinagawa Kyurian Hall

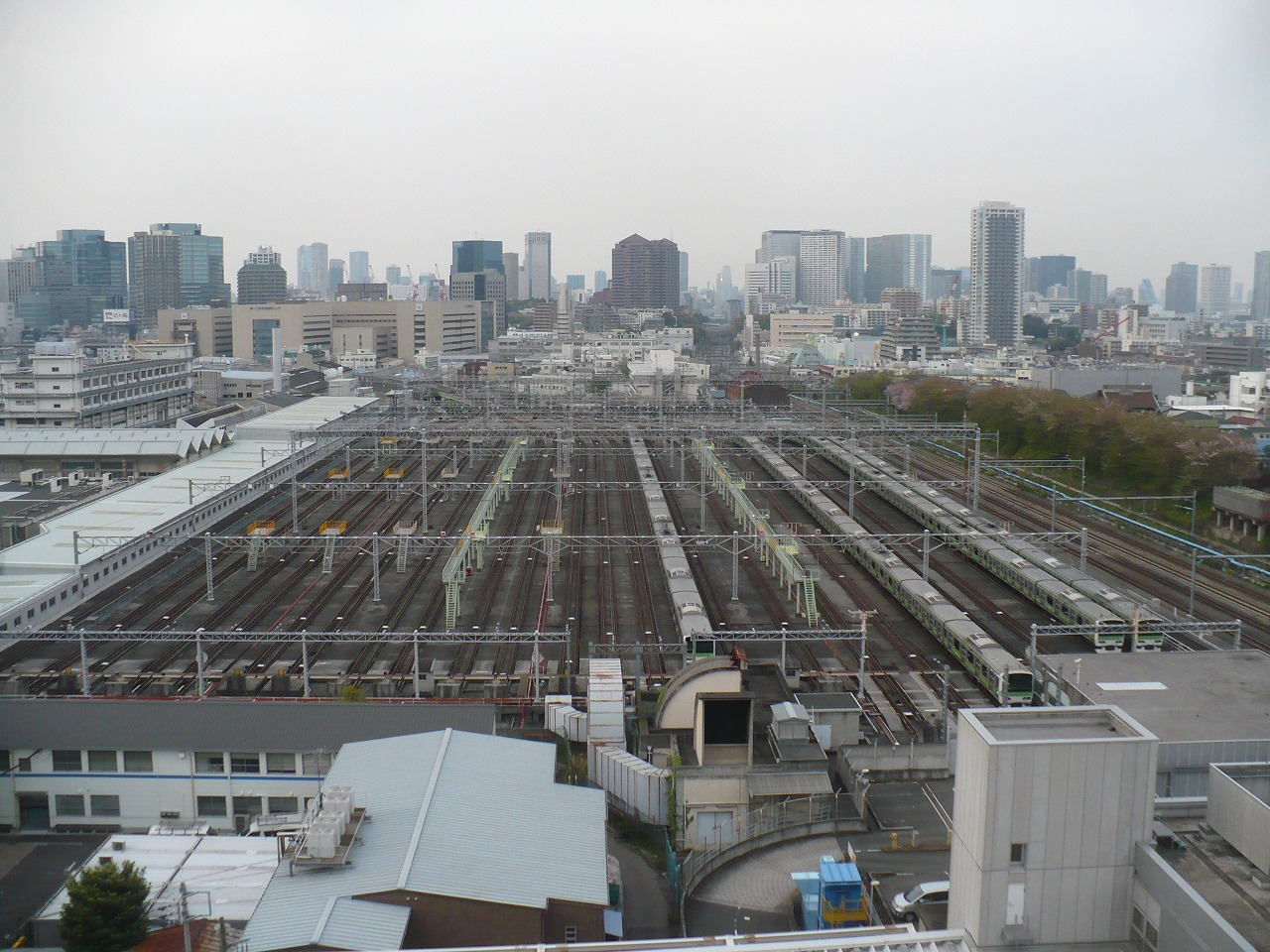
JR Tokyo General Rolling Stock Center

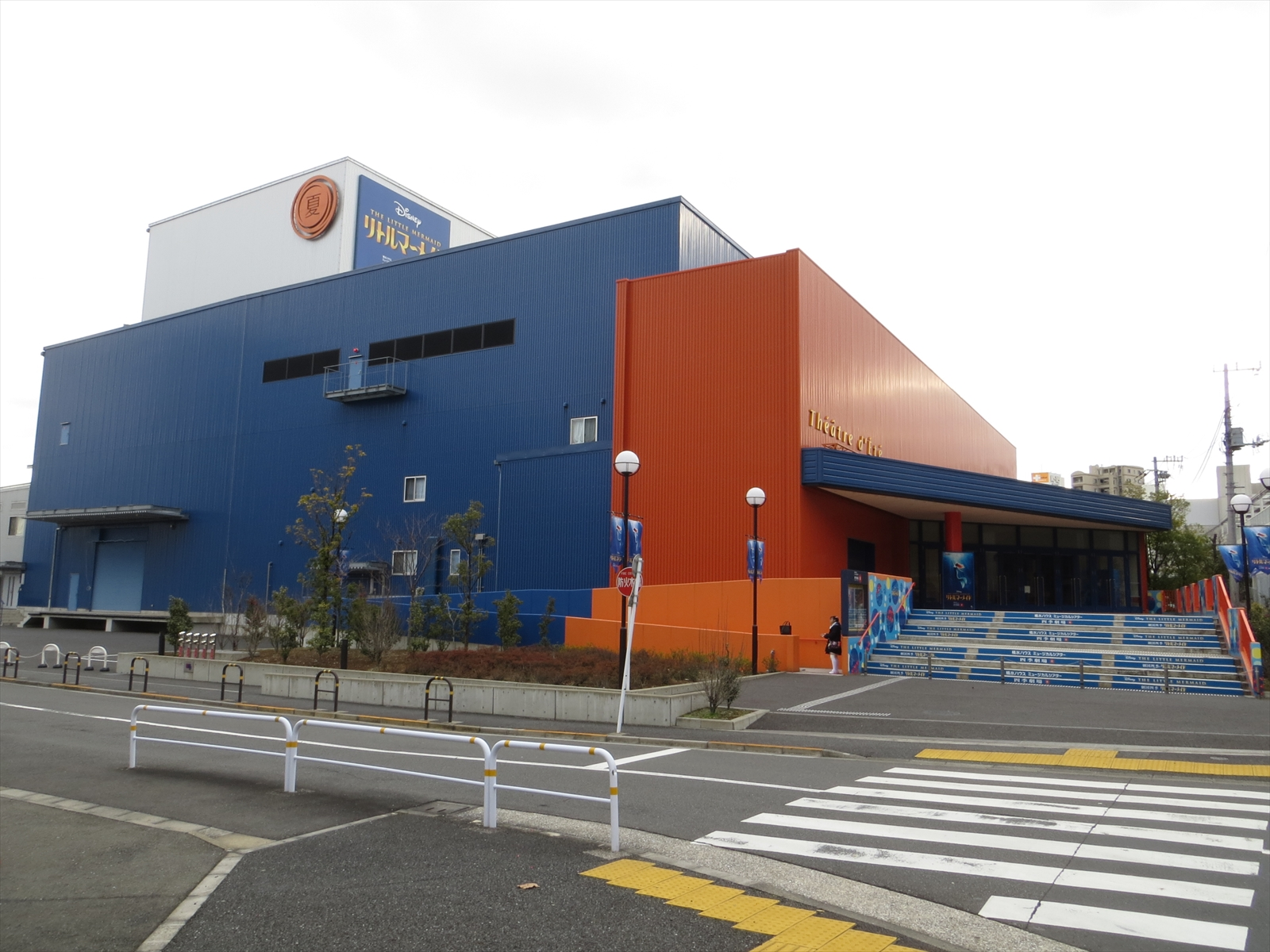
The Shiki Theatre Natsu

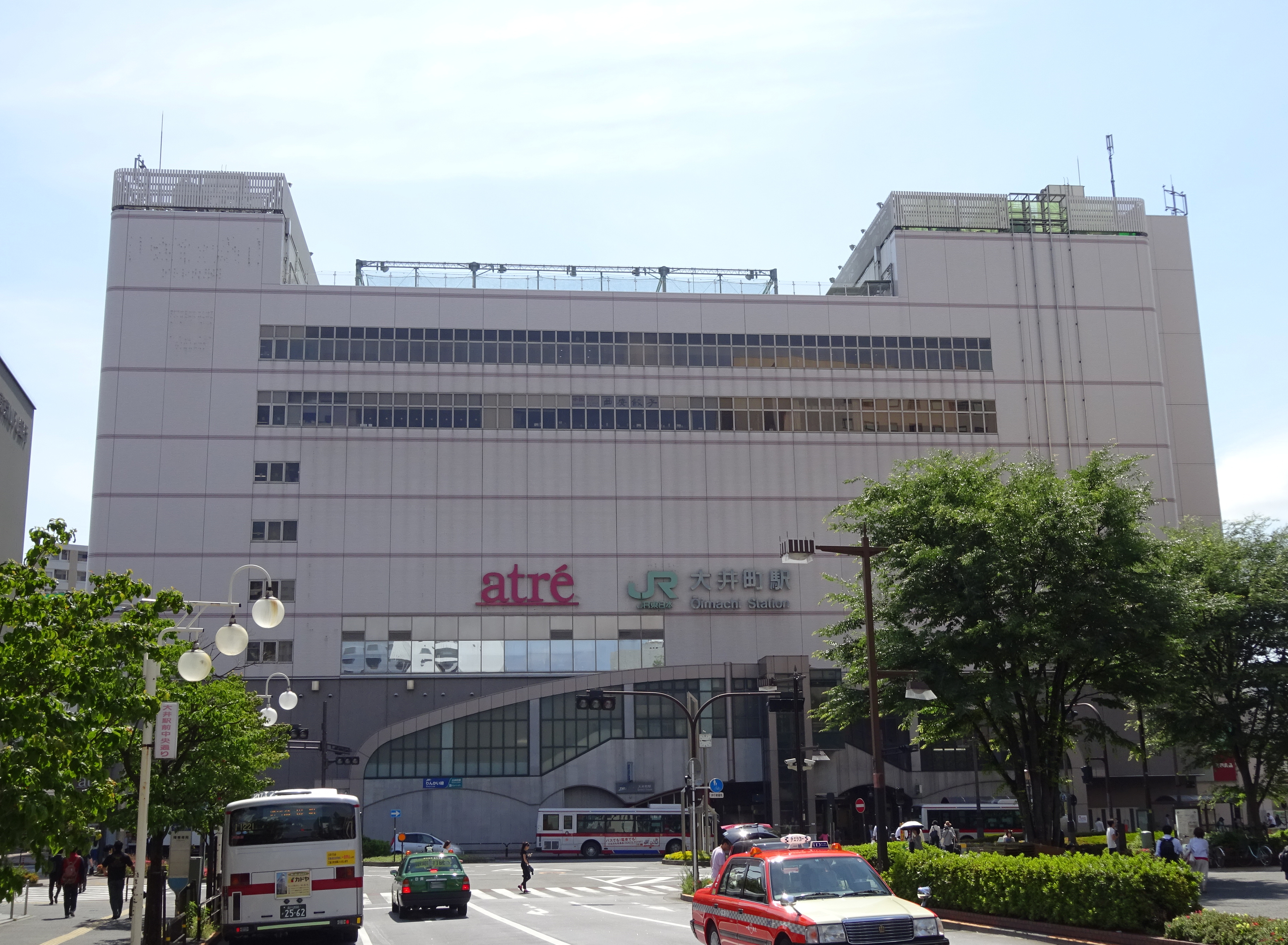
Atré Shopping Centre

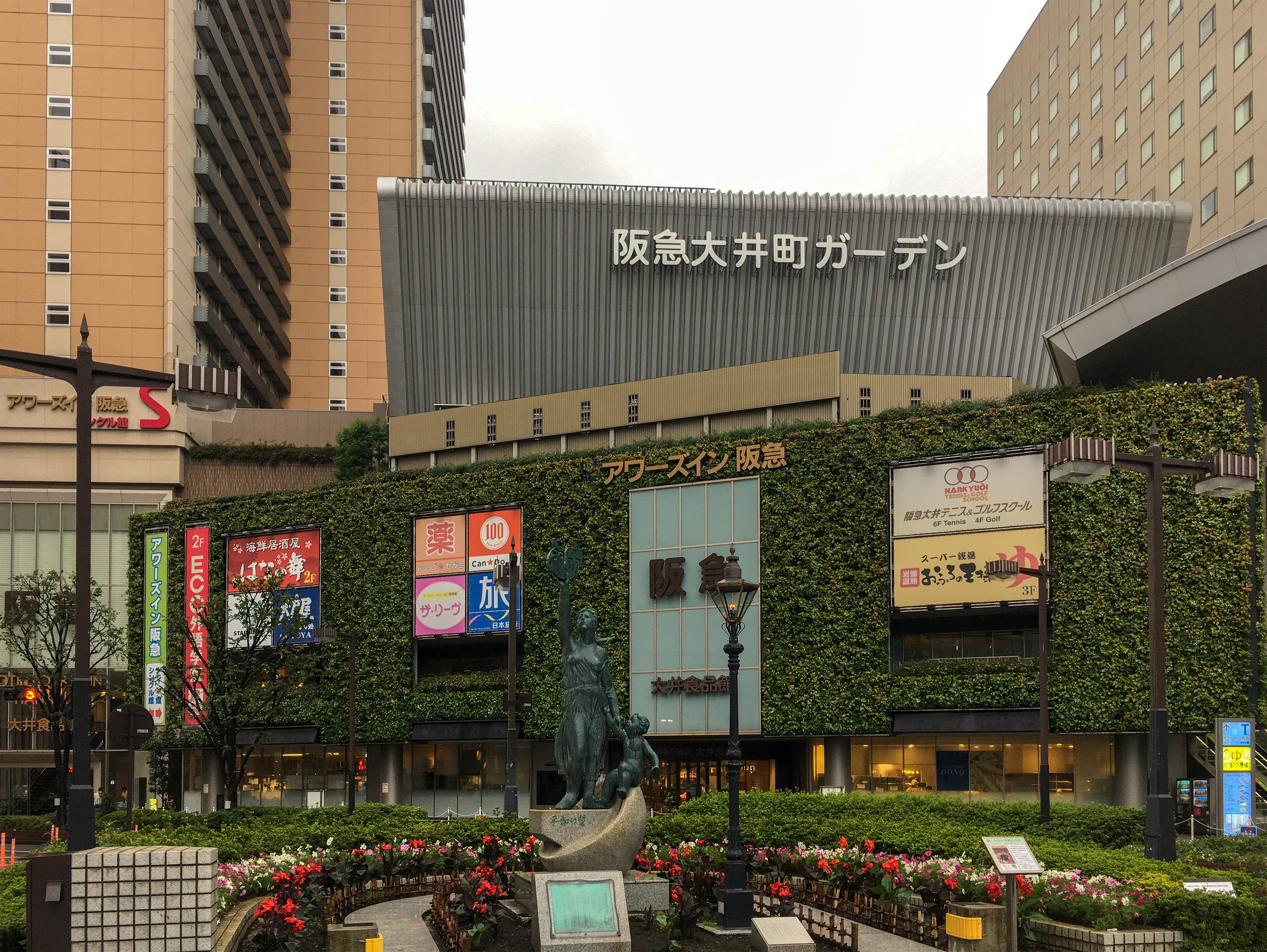
Hankyu Oimachi Garden

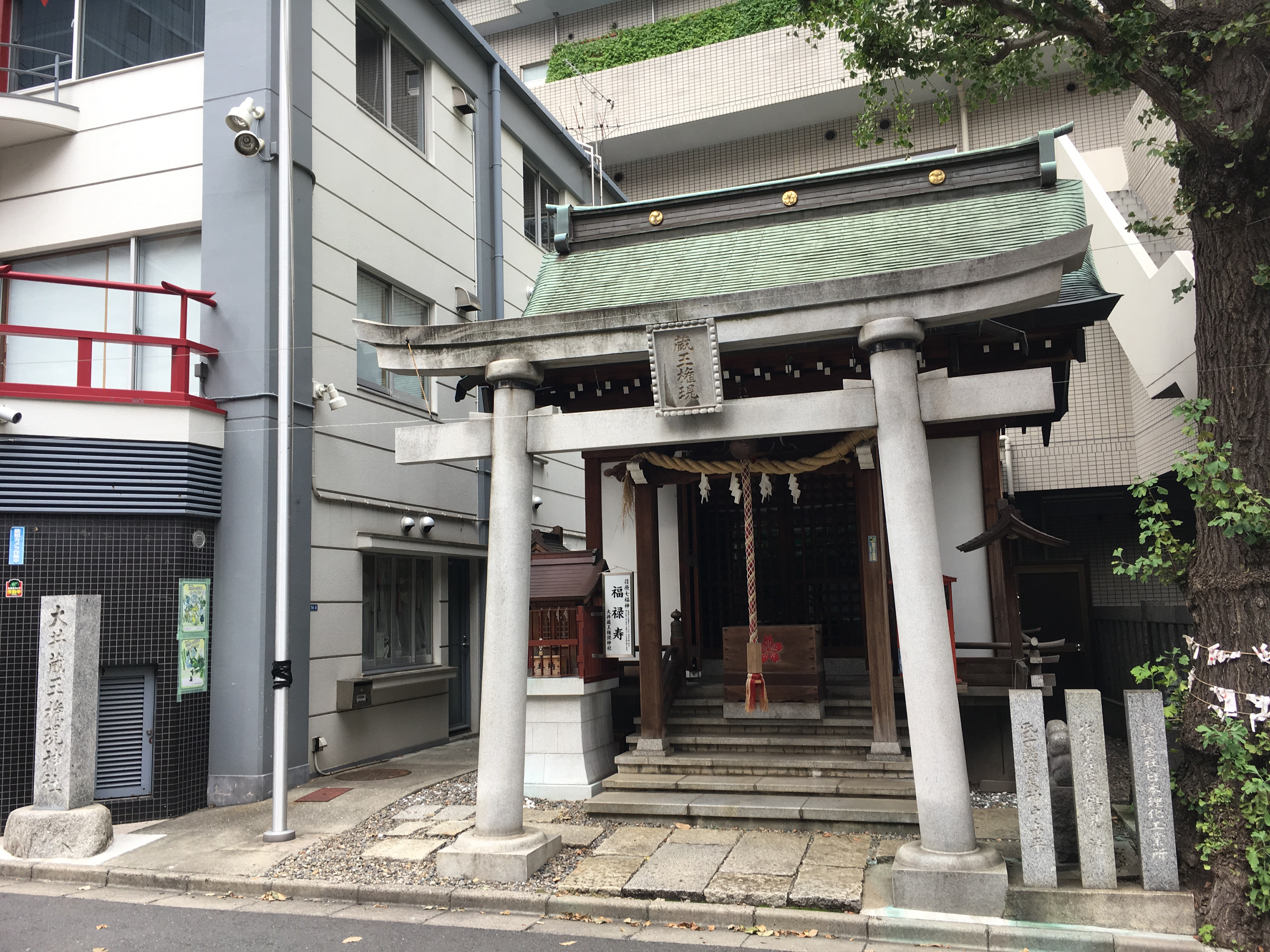
Ōi zao Gongen-jinja Shrine

== See also ==
- List of railway stations in Japan
