= Shinagawa Seaside Station =

Railway station in Tokyo, Japan

R06 Shinagawa Seaside Station 品川シーサイド駅
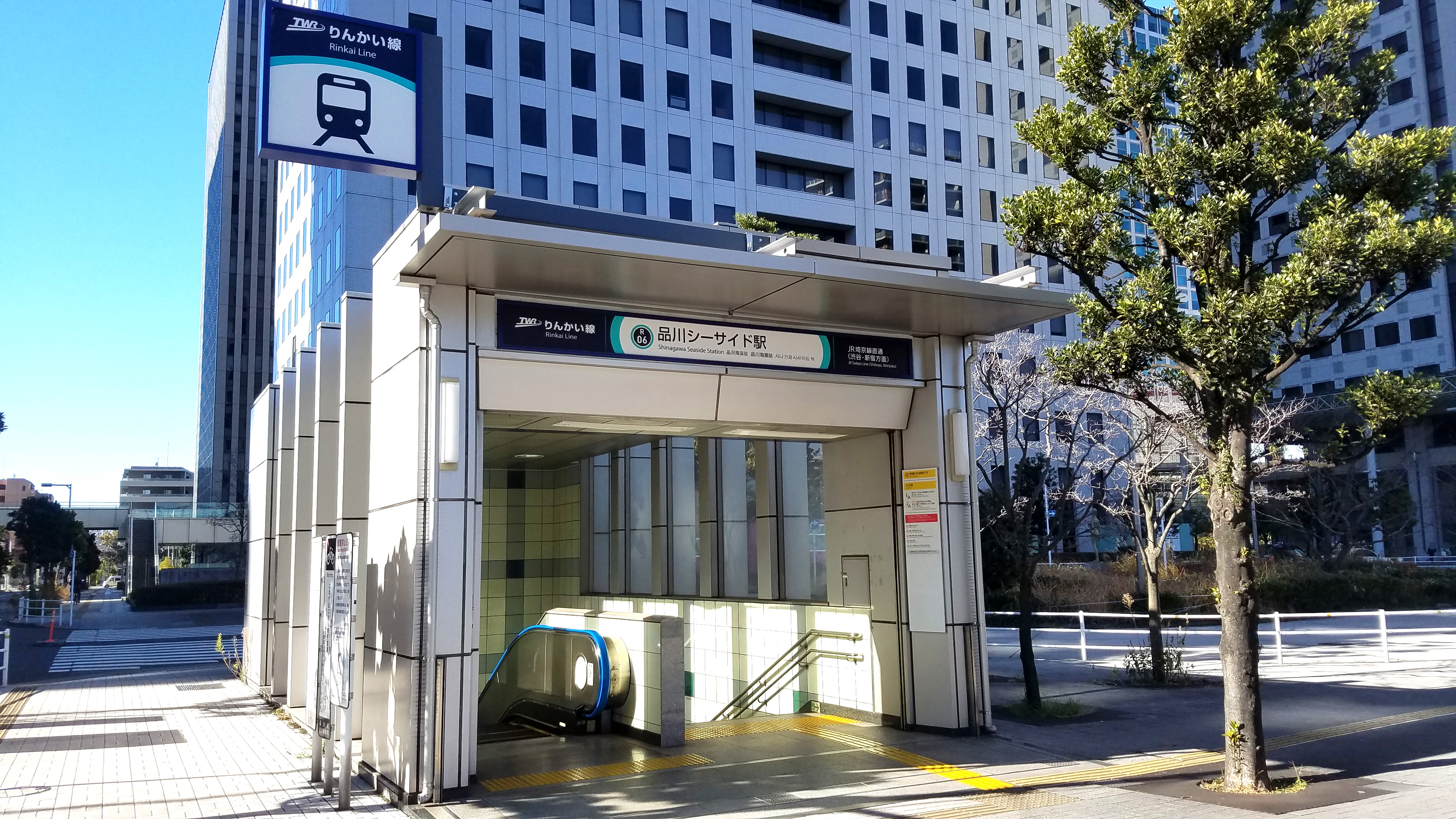
- The B entrance to the station in January 2022

General information
- Location: Shinagawa, Tokyo; Japan
- Coordinates: 35°36′35″N 139°44′59″E
- Operator: Tokyo Waterfront Area Rapid Transit
- Line: Rinkai Line
- Distance: 8.9 km (5.5 mi) from Shin-kiba
- Platforms: 1 island platform
- Tracks: 2

Construction
- Structure type: Underground

Other information
- Station code: R06

History
- Opened: 1 December 2002

Passengers
- FY2024: 18,773 daily
- Rank: 6 out of 8

Services
Preceding station	Tokyo Waterfront Area Rapid Transit	Following station
Ōimachi R07 towards Ōsaki	Rinkai Line	Tennōzu Isle R05 towards Shin-Kiba
Location
- Location within Special wards of Tokyo Location within Tokyo Location within Japan

Shinagawa Seaside Station (Japanese: 品川シーサイド駅, Hepburn: Shinagawa Shīsaido-eki) is a railway station on the Rinkai Line in Shinagawa, Tokyo, Japan, operated by the third-sector railway operating company Tokyo Waterfront Area Rapid Transit (TWR).

== Lines ==
Shinagawa Seaside Station is served by the Tokyo Waterfront Area Rapid Transit Rinkai Line between Ōsaki and Shin-Kiba, with many through trains continuing to and from the East Japan Railway Company (JR East) Saikyō Line and Kawagoe Line.

== Station layout ==
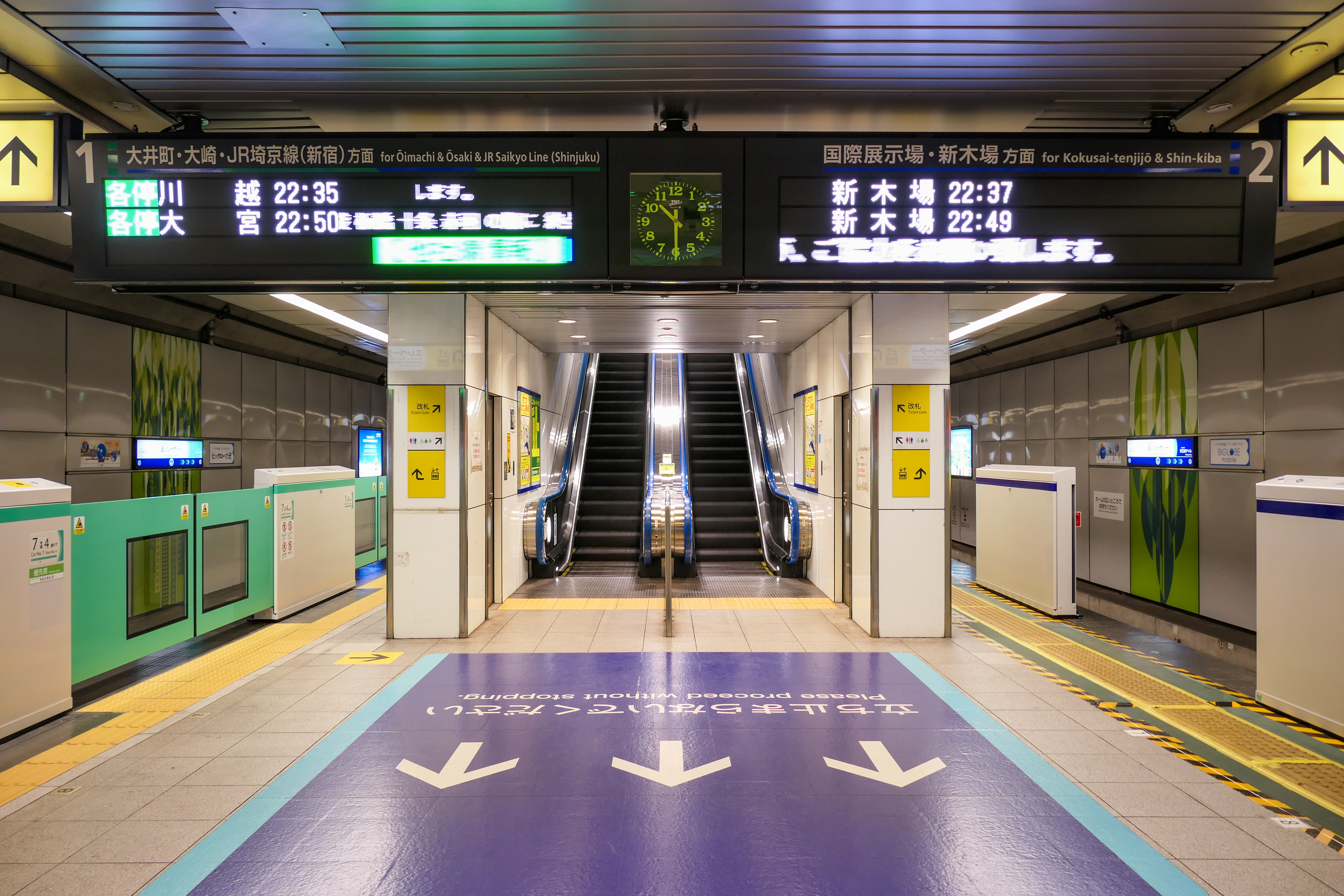
The platforms in February 2022

The underground station concourse is located on the basement ("1BF") level, and the single island platform is located on the third-basement ("3BF") level, serving two tracks. There are three entrances to the station: "A" at the north end, and "B" and "C" at the south end.

== History ==
The station opened on 1 December 2002.

Station numbering was introduced in 2016 with Shinagawa Seaside being assigned station number R06.

Platform screen doors became operational on the platforms in early 2022.

== Passenger statistics ==
In fiscal 2011, the station was used by an average of 20,917 passengers daily.

== Surrounding area ==
=== Entrance A ===
- Tepco Oi power station
- Tokai Junior High School
- Amazon Shinagawa Photo Studio

=== Entrance B ===
- Shinagawa Seaside Park
- Advanced Institute of Industrial Technology

=== Entrance C ===
- Shinagawa Seaside TS Tower
- Hotel Sun Route Shinagawa Seaside

== See also ==
- List of railway stations in Japan
