= Tokyo Rinkai Subway Line =

Proposed railway line in Tokyo, Japan

Overview
- Native name: 東京臨海地下鉄線
- Status: Proposed
- Locale: Tokyo Prefecture
- Termini: Tokyo; Ariake / Tokyo Big Sight
- Stations: 7

Service
- Type: Heavy rail
- Operator: Tokyo Waterfront Area Rapid Transit (planned)

History
- Planned opening: 2040 (tentative)

Technical
- Line length: 6.1 km (3.8 mi)
- Number of tracks: 2
- Track gauge: 1,067 mm (3 ft 6 in)
- Electrification: Overhead line, 1,500 V DC

The Tokyo Rinkai Subway Line (Japanese: 東京臨海地下鉄線, Hepburn: Tōkyō Rinkai chikatetsu-sen) is the tentative name for a planned underground heavy rail line which will run north-south between Tokyo Station and the Ariake district along Tokyo Bay. As of 25 November 2022, the projected completion date is in the 2040s.

== Background ==
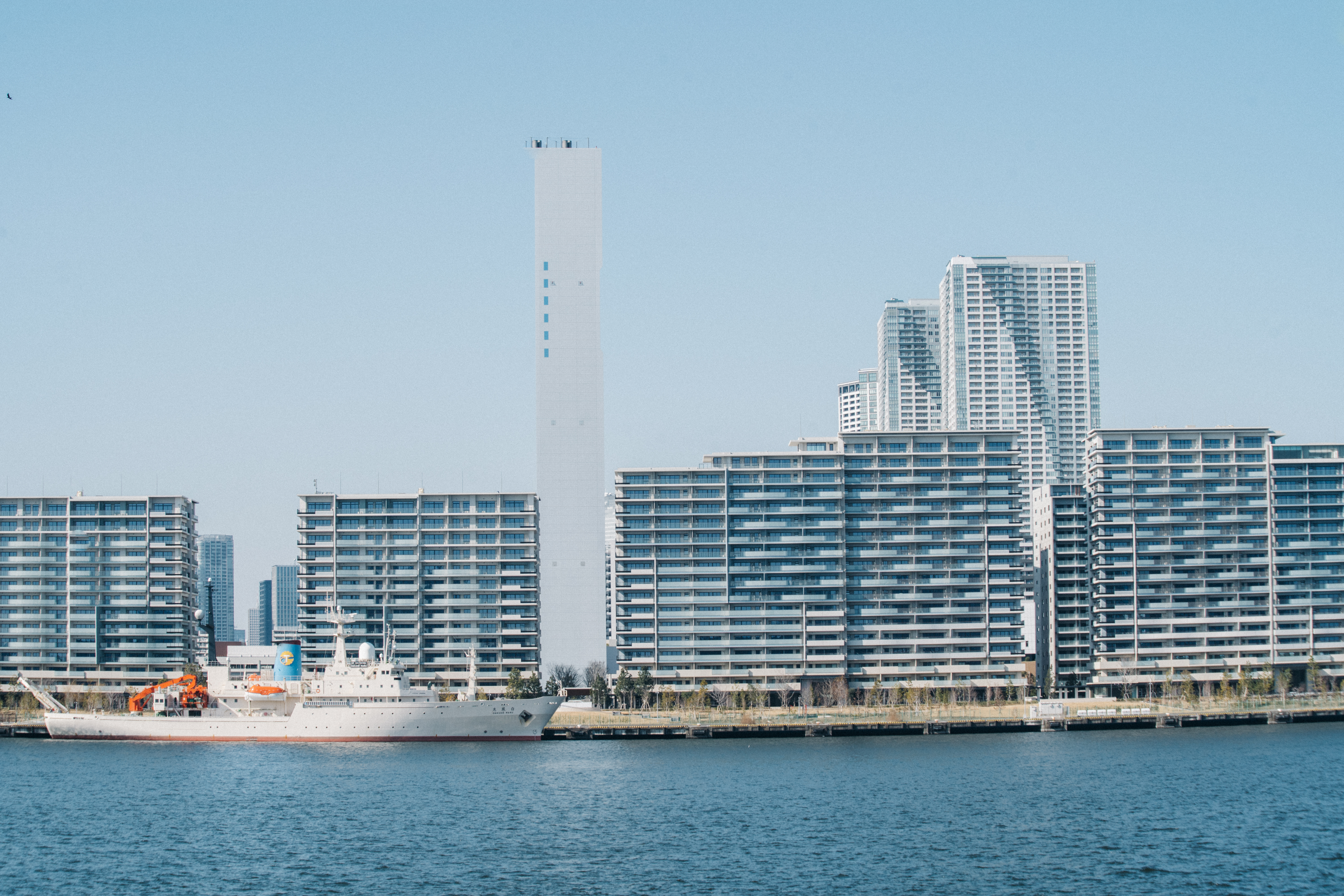
Harumi, site of the former Athlete's Village of the 2020 Summer Olympics

Plans to construct a new subway line connecting Tokyo Station to the Tokyo Bay area had been in discussion since 2015 as Tokyo was undergoing preparations to host the 2020 Summer Olympics. However, on 25 November 2022, Tokyo governor Yuriko Koike revealed concrete plans to construct the subway line. The line will be around 6.1 km (3.8 mi) long and will feature seven stations. Overall, the cost is expected to be ¥420−510 billion and is projected to open in the 2040s. There are plans to run through services with the Rinkai Line and the Tsukuba Express along with a possible integration with the JR Haneda Airport Access Line. The rationale for building the line is due to the development of Tokyo Bay and the integration of leftover facilities from the 2020 Summer Olympics such as the athlete's village (which have since been re-marketed as condominiums) and competitor venues. In addition, the island on which the former athlete's village is located, Harumi, remains without a railway connection, instead being served by the Tokyo BRT network.

Construction is projected to begin in the 2030s. As of November 2022, the company in charge of construction has not been decided.

In February 2024, the Tokyo Metropolitan Government announced that the Japan Railway Construction, Transport and Technology Agency and Tokyo Waterfront Area Rapid Transit (operator of the Rinkai Line) reached an agreement to construct and operate the line respectively.

=== Possible through service ===
The Tokyo Metropolitan Government has considered several through service options for the Rinkai Subway Line. On the northern end, the line could connect to the Tsukuba Express at Akihabara Station. On the southern end the line could connect to the Rinkai Line near Kokusai-Tenjijō Station. By connecting to the Rinkai Line, trains could also continue onto the Haneda Airport Access Line, which is also under construction.

== Stations ==
All station names are provisional. All stations are located in Tokyo.

Station	Distance in km (mi)		Transfers	Location
Station	Between stations	Total	Transfers	Location
Tokyo 東京	—N/a	0 (0)	Tokaido Shinkansen; Akita Shinkansen; Hokkaido Shinkansen; Jōetsu Shinkansen; Tōhoku Shinkansen; Yamagata Shinkansen; Yamanote Line (JY01); Keihin–Tōhoku Line (JK26); Chūō Line (JC01); Keiyō Line (JE01); Tōkaidō Line (JT01); Ueno–Tokyo Line (JU01); Yokosuka Line/Sōbu Line (Rapid) (JO19); Marunouchi Line (M-17); Chiyoda Line (Nijubashimae: C-10); Mita Line (Hibiya: I-08)	Chiyoda
Shin-Ginza 新銀座	1.0 (0.62)	1.0 (0.62)		Chūō
Shin Tsukiji 新築地	1.6 (0.99)	2.6 (1.6)		Chūō
Kachidoki 勝どき	0.6 (0.37)	3.2 (2.0)	Toei Ōedo Line (E-12)	Chūō
Harumi 晴海	0.7 (0.43)	3.9 (2.4)		Chūō
Toyosu Market 豊洲市場	1.1 (0.68)	5.0 (3.1)	Yurikamome (Shijō-mae: U-14)	Kōtō
Ariake / Tokyo Big Sight 有明・東京ビッグサイト	1.1 (0.68)	6.1 (3.8)	Yurikamome (Ariake: U-12); Rinkai Line (Kokusai-Tenjijō: R-03)	Kōtō
