= Rinkai Line =

Train line in Tokyo, Japan

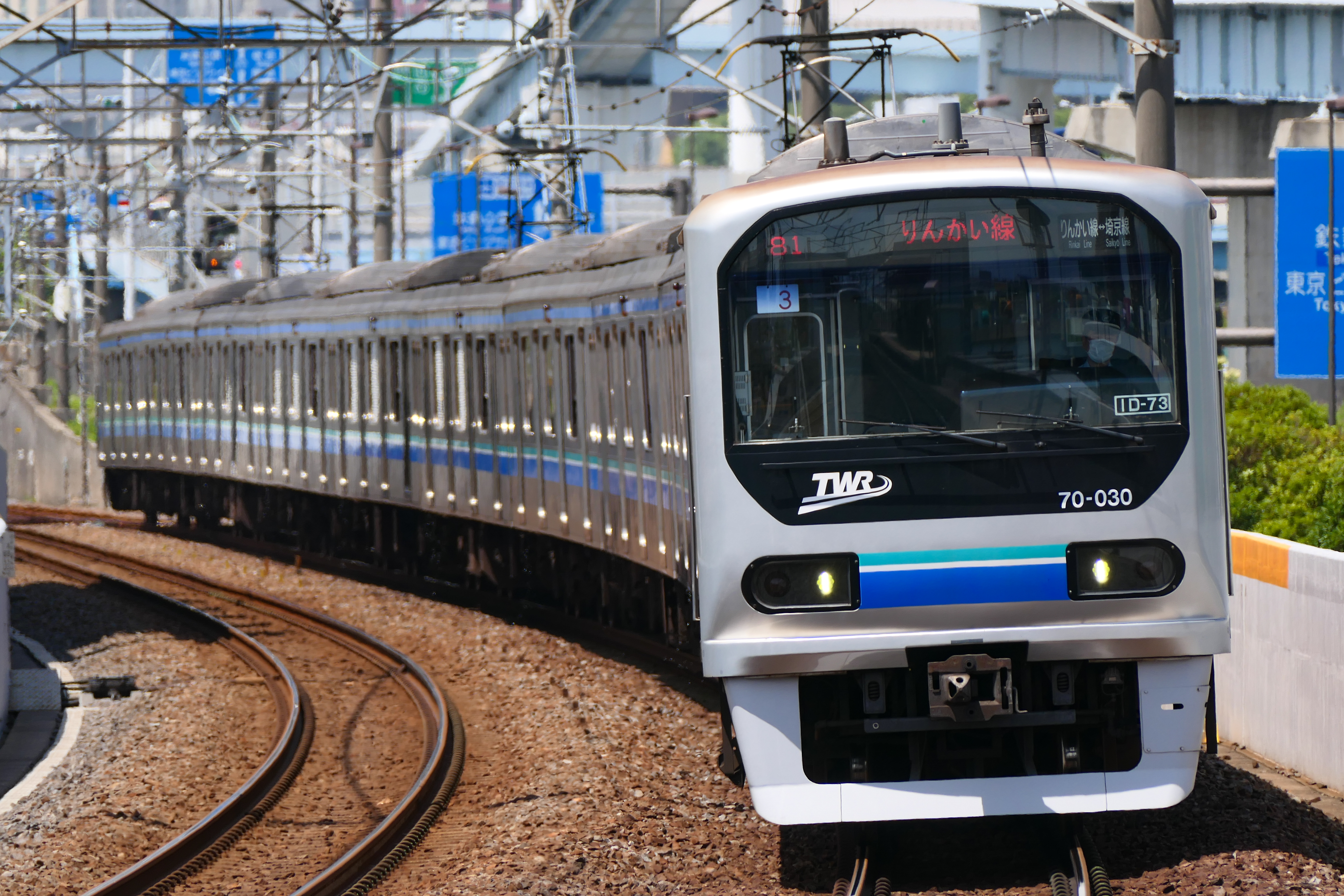
- A TWR 70-000 series train on the Rinkai Line, heading towards Shin-Kiba

Overview
- Native name: りんかい線
- Status: In service
- Owner: Tokyo Waterfront Area Rapid Transit, Inc.
- Locale: Tokyo
- Termini: Shin-Kiba; Ōsaki
- Stations: 8

Service
- Type: Heavy rail
- Route number: R
- Depot: Yashio
- Rolling stock: TWR 70-000 series, TWR 71-000 series, E233-7000 series
- Daily ridership: 225,431 (JFY2024)

History
- Opened: March 30, 1996; 30 years ago

Technical
- Line length: 12.2 km (7.6 mi)
- Num of tracks: 2
- Track gauge: 1,067 mm (3 ft 6 in)
- Electrification: Overhead line, 1,500 V DC
Route map

The Rinkai Line (Japanese: りんかい線, Hepburn: Rinkai-sen; lit. 'Waterfront Line') is a railway line in Tokyo, Japan. It is the only line operated by the third-sector company Tokyo Waterfront Area Rapid Transit, which is primary owned by the Tokyo Metropolitan Government. Opened in phases starting in March 1996, it connects central Tokyo with the artificial islands of Aomi and Odaiba. The line is served by some trains on the East Japan Railway Company (JR East) Saikyō Line which continue on to Shinjuku, Ikebukuro, Ōmiya, and Kawagoe.

The line is often referred to as the Tokyo Rinkai Kosoku Tetsudo Rinkai Line (東京臨海高速鉄道りんかい線), including the name of its operating company, to distinguish it from the proposed Tokyo Rinkai Subway Line.

== Overview ==
While not part of the Tokyo subway network (as it was built to JR specifications), the Rinkai Line is fully grade separated and runs underground for nearly 10 kilometers (6.2 miles) of its total 12.2 kilometer (7.6 mile) route, going as low as 40 meters (130 ft) below the ground when crossing under the Port of Tokyo. The Shinonome – Shin-Kiba segment (which uses the former Keiyō Freight Line) is elevated.

== Station list ==
All stations are located in Tokyo. All trains stop at every station on the line.

No.	Station	Distance in km (mi)		Transfers	Location
No.	Station	Between stations	Total	Transfers	Location
R01	Shin-Kiba 新木場	—N/a	0 (0)	Keiyō Line (JE05); Yūrakuchō Line (Y-24)	Kōtō
R02	Shinonome 東雲	2.2 (1.4)	2.2 (1.4)		Kōtō
R03	Kokusai-Tenjijō 国際展示場	1.3 (0.81)	3.5 (2.2)	Yurikamome (Ariake: U-12); Tokyo BRT (B-05)	Kōtō
R04	Tokyo Teleport 東京テレポート	1.4 (0.87)	4.9 (3.0)		Kōtō
R05	Tennōzu Isle 天王洲アイル	2.9 (1.8)	7.8 (4.8)	Haneda Airport Line (MO02)	Shinagawa
R06	Shinagawa Seaside 品川シーサイド	1.1 (0.68)	8.9 (5.5)		Shinagawa
R07	Ōimachi 大井町	1.6 (0.99)	10.5 (6.5)	Keihin–Tōhoku Line (JK19); Ōimachi Line (OM01)	Shinagawa
R08	Ōsaki 大崎	1.7 (1.1)	12.2 (7.6)	Yamanote Line (JY24); Shōnan–Shinjuku Line (JS17); Saikyō Line (through service); Sōtetsu–JR Link Line (JA08)	Shinagawa
↓ Through-running to/from Kawagoe via the Saikyō and Kawagoe lines ↓

== Rolling stock ==
- TWR 70-000 series 10-car EMUs (since 1996)
- TWR 71-000 series 10-car EMUs (since 1 October 2025)
- JR East E233-7000 series 10-car EMUs (since 30 June 2013)

The TWR 70-000 series electric multiple unit (EMU) trains are based at Yashio Depot, which is accessed via a spur located between Tennōzu Isle Station and Tokyo Teleport Station (the spur track also provides access to Tokyo Freight Terminal), while the E233 series trains are based at Kawagoe Depot.

The first of a fleet of 31 new 10-car E233-7000 series sets were introduced on Saikyō Line, Kawagoe Line, and Rinkai Line services between Kawagoe and Shin-Kiba from 30 June 2013, displacing the fleet of 205 series EMUs.

A new train type will be introduced in 2024, replacing the 70-000 series. The new type was revealed to be designated as 71-000 series on 6 November 2023. The revised entry into service is scheduled to take place in the middle of 2025 rather than 2024.

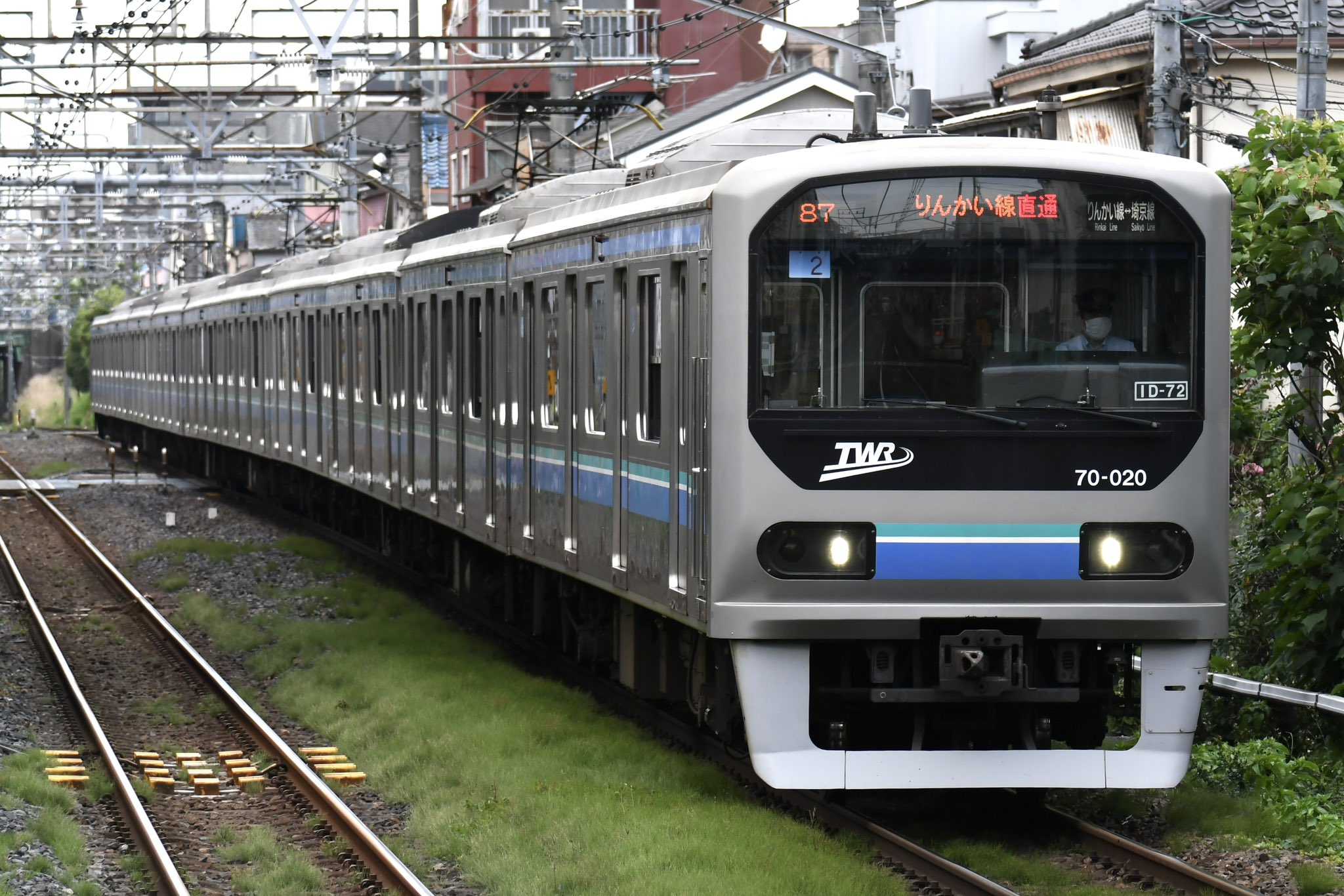
TWR 70-000 series EMU in June 2022

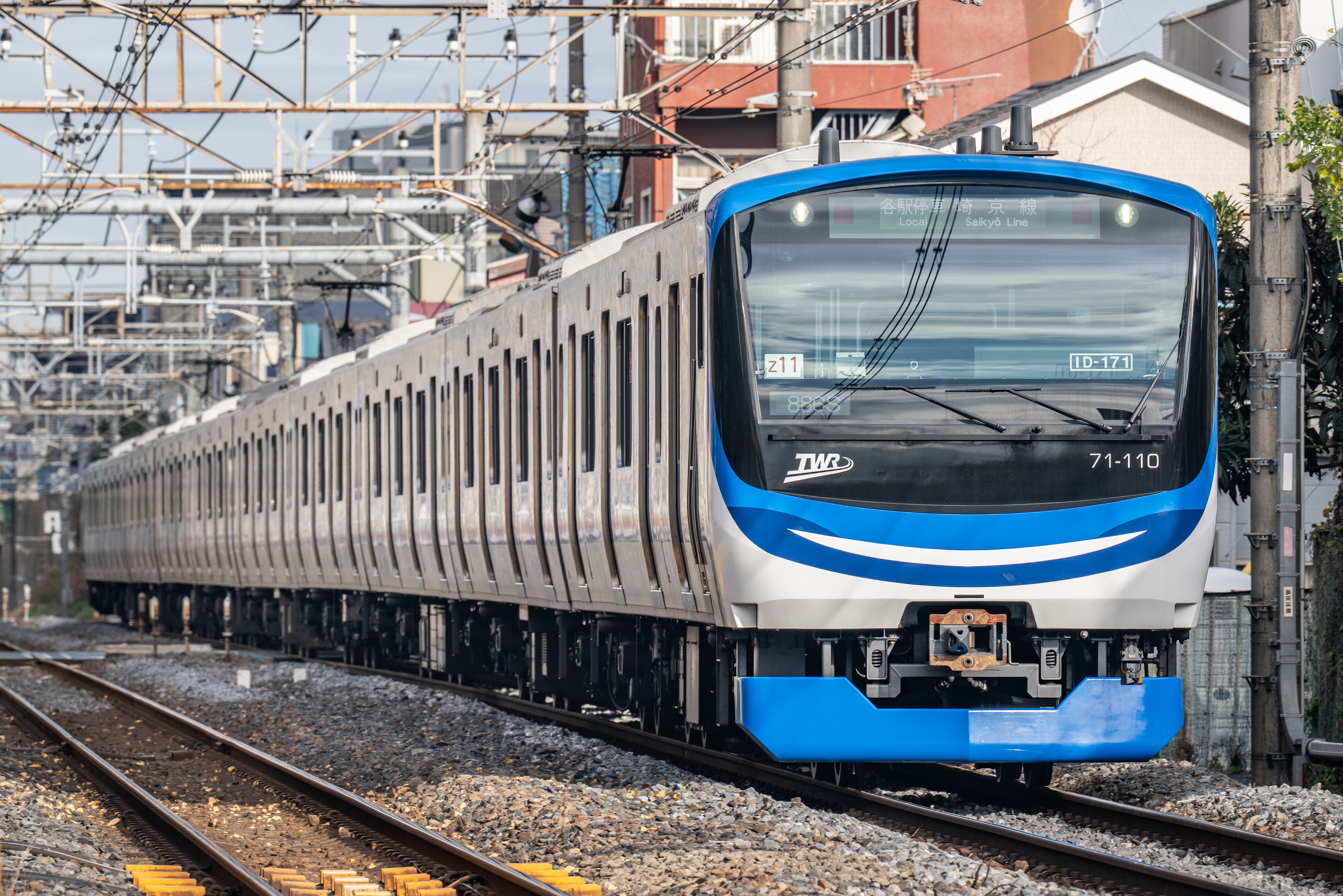
TWR 71-000 series EMU in December 2025

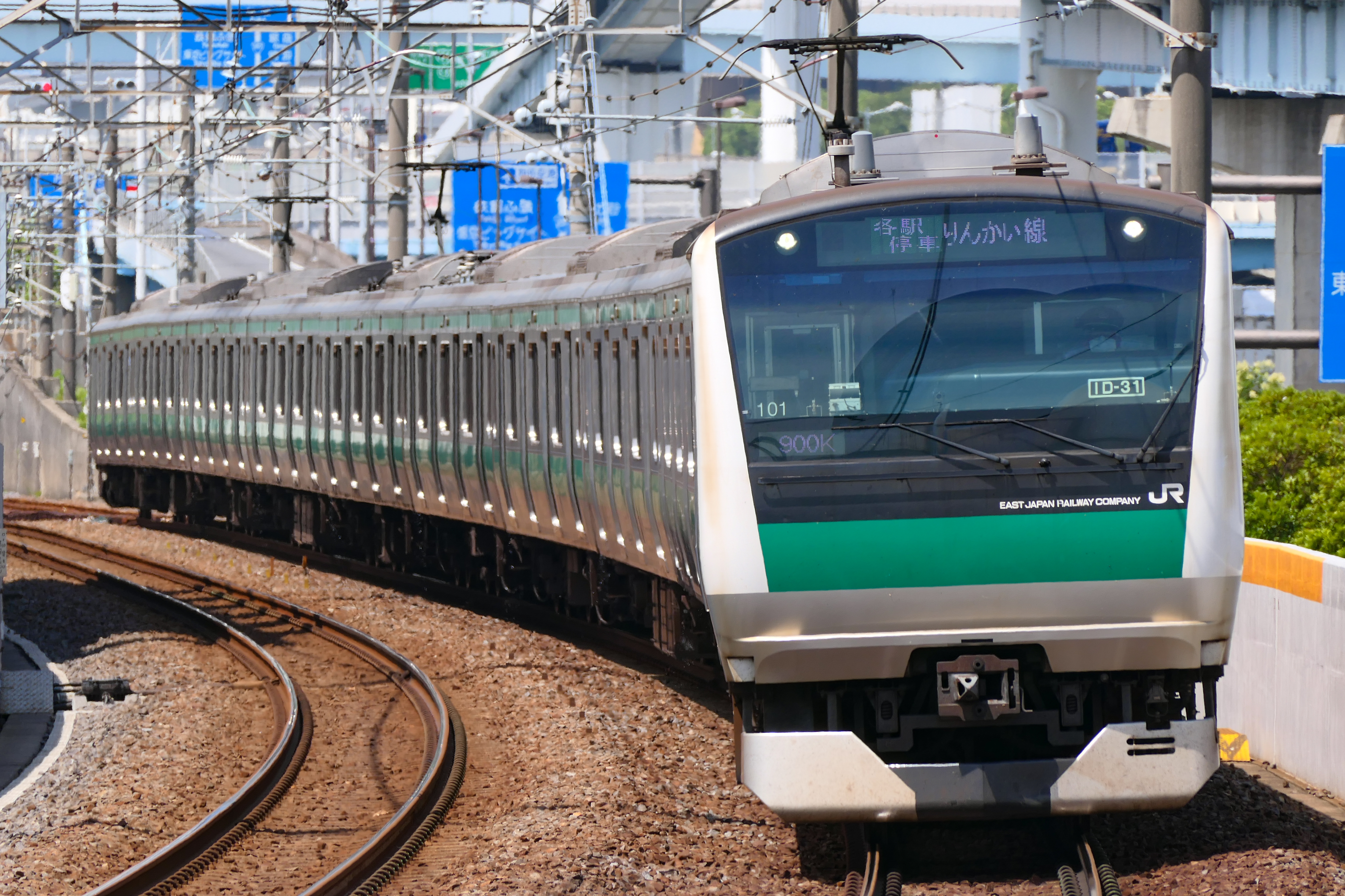
A JR East E233-7000 series EMU on the Rinkai Line in June 2022

=== Former rolling stock ===
- JR East 205 series 10-car EMUs (2002–2016)
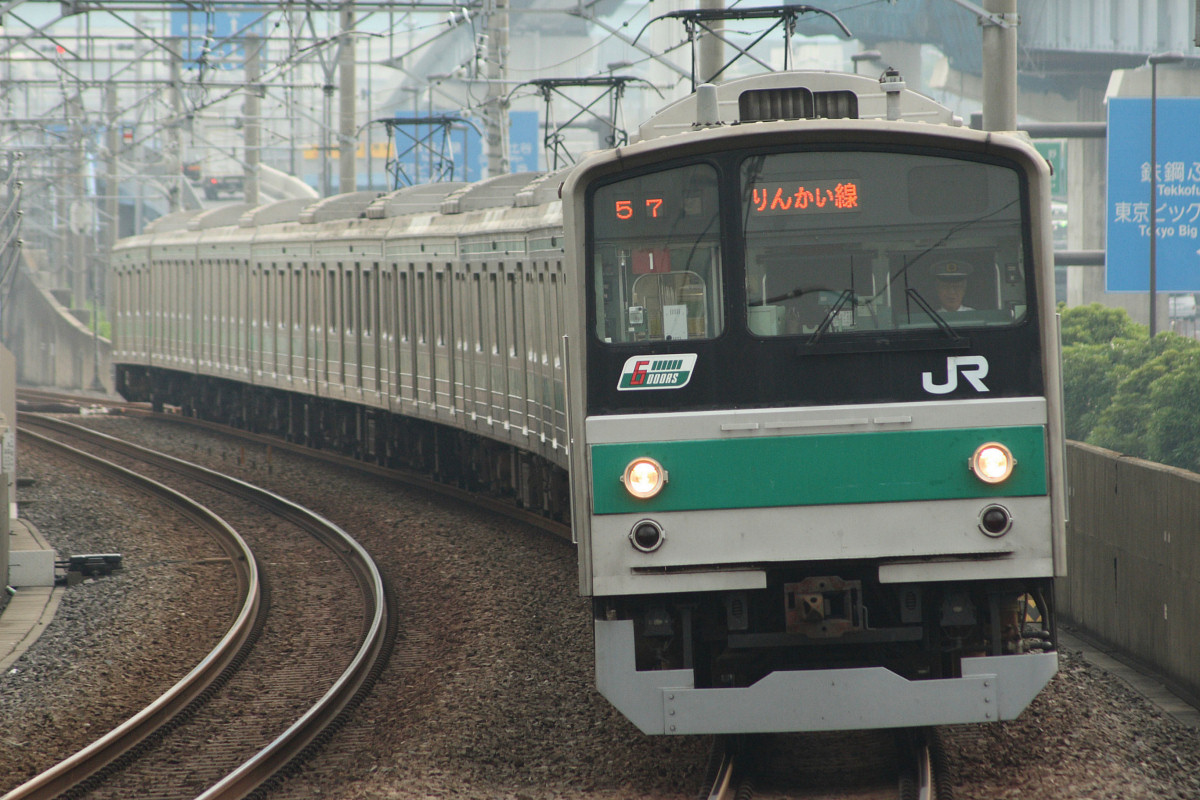
A JR East 205 series EMU on the Rinkai Line in July 2008

== History ==
Construction of the line started in 1992, with the eastern end of the line using the right-of-way of the Keiyō Freight Line (abandoned in 1983). The first portion of the line between Shin-Kiba and Tokyo Teleport opened for service on March 30, 1996, initially under the name Rinkai Fukutoshin Line (臨海副都心線, Rinkai-fukutoshin-sen). The name was officially changed to the Rinkai Line on September 1, 2000. The extension to Tennōzu Isle opened on March 31, 2001, and the final portion to Osaki on December 1, 2002.

The project ran severely over budget, with an estimated final cost of over ¥440 billion. In 2005, the Rinkai Line's average ridership was 140,000 passengers per day and, in 2006, the line finally registered its first operational profit, although interest payments on ¥389 billion yen in debt have resulted in a consistent net loss since 1991. By comparison, the competing elevated Yurikamome line is profitable, thanks to lower construction expenses, higher ticket prices and popularity among tourists and leisure visitors for its scenic views.

However, the Rinkai Line's ridership has steadily increased since, reaching 200,200 passengers per day in 2010. The ridership is forecast to increase further due to future development planned for the area served by the line.

Station numbering was introduced to all Rinkai Line stations in 2016.

== Operating company ==
Tokyo Waterfront Area Rapid Transit, Inc.
- Native name: 東京臨海高速鉄道株式会社
- Romanized name: Tōkyō Rinkai Kōsoku Tetsudō Kabushiki-gaisha
- Type: Private
- Industry: Rail transport
- Founded: 12 March 1991; 35 years ago
- Headquarters: Kōtō, Tokyo, Japan
- Key people: Yuichi Ueno (President & CEO)
- Revenue: ▲¥19.128 billion (JFY24)
- Operating income: ▲¥4.394 billion (JFY24)
- Net income: ▲¥3.497 billion (JFY24)
- Total assets: ▼¥186,787 billion (JFY24)
- Owner: Tokyo Metropolitan Government (91.3%); JR East (2.4%); Shinagawa (1.8%); (as of 1 April 2014)
- Number of employees: 247
- Website: www.twr.co.jp

Tokyo Waterfront Area Rapid Transit, Inc. (Note: Japanese: 東京臨海高速鉄道株式会社, Hepburn: Tōkyō Rinkai Kōsoku Tetsudō Kabushiki-gaisha) was founded on March 12, 1991, for the express purpose of constructing and operating the railway line.

It is a third-sector company, and, as of 1 April 2024, 91.32% of shares are held by the Tokyo Metropolitan Government, 2.41% by JR East, 1.77% by Shinagawa Ward, 0.7% by Mizuho Bank, 0.46% by MUFG Bank, 0.34% by Sumitomo Mitsui Banking Corporation, and the remaining 3% by 38 other companies.

In spite of its severe financial situation, TWR was discovered to have made a five million yen donation to the Tokyo Metropolitan Government on October 16, 2009, to encourage the city's bid for the 2016 Olympic Games. The company stood to benefit financially if the games were held in Tokyo, as several of the proposed venues were located along the Rinkai Line.

In addition to its ownership and operation of the Rinkai Line, TWR is also involved in real estate and subcontracting/management of station- and building-related design.

== Future plans ==
In August 2014, it was reported that East Japan Railway Company (JR East) was negotiating to acquire Tokyo Waterfront Area Rapid Transit (TWR), the operator of the Rinkai Line. The acquisition would have facilitated JR East's plans for the Haneda Airport Access Line, including direct services to Haneda Airport and through services between the Rinkai Line and the Keiyō Line at Shin-Kiba Station, similar to the through service between the Saikyō Line and Rinkai Line at Ōsaki Station.

In February 2024, TWR was announced as the planned operator of the proposed Tokyo Rinkai Subway Line. A connection between the Rinkai Line and the proposed subway line near Kokusai-Tenjijō Station has also been considered.
