= Tennōzu Isle Station =

Railway and monorail station in Tokyo, Japan

R05 MO02 Tennōzu Isle Station 天王洲アイル駅
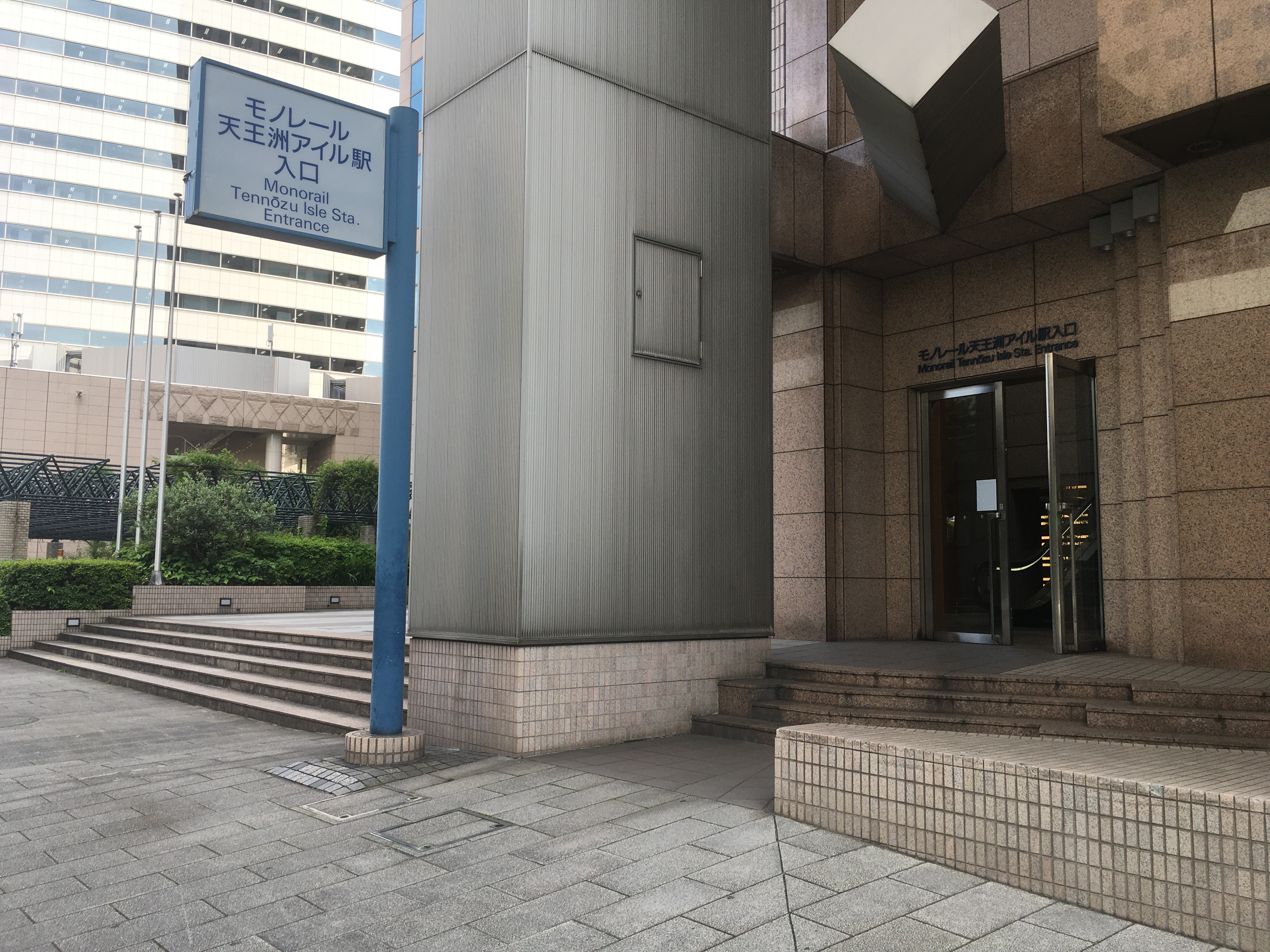
- Tennōzu Isle Station entrance, 2022

General information
- Location: Shinagawa, Tokyo; Japan
- Coordinates: 35°37′14″N 139°45′3″E
- Operator: Tokyo Monorail; Tokyo Waterfront Area Rapid Transit
- Lines: Haneda Airport Line; Rinkai Line
- Distance: Tokyo Monorail: 4.0 km (2.5 mi) from Monorail Hamamatsuchō; Rinkai Line: 7.8 km (4.8 mi) from Shin-Kiba
- Platforms: Tokyo Monorail: 2 side platforms; Rinkai Line: 1 island platform
- Tracks: Tokyo Monorail: 2; Rinkai Line: 2

Construction
- Structure type: Tokyo Monorail: elevated Rinkai Line: underground

Other information
- Station code: Tokyo Monorail: MO-02; Rinkai Line: R05

History
- Opened: Tokyo Monorail: 19 June 1992; Rinkai Line: 31 March 2001

Passengers
- FY2024: 15,669 daily (Rinkai Line)
- Rank: 7 of 8 (Rinkai Line)

Services
Preceding station	Tokyo Waterfront Area Rapid Transit	Following station
Shinagawa Seaside R06 towards Ōsaki	Rinkai Line	Tokyo Teleport R04 towards Shin-Kiba
Preceding station	Tokyo Monorail	Following station
Monorail Hamamatsuchō MO01 Terminus	Haneda Airport Line Rapid Local	Ōi Keibajō Mae MO03 towards Haneda Airport Terminal 2
Location
- Location within Special wards of Tokyo Location within Tokyo Location within Japan

Tennōzu Isle Station (Japanese: 天王洲アイル駅, Hepburn: Tennōzu Airu-eki) are a pair of stations in Shinagawa, Tokyo, Japan, operated by Tokyo Monorail and Tokyo Waterfront Area Rapid Transit (TWR). They are connected by a walkway about 100 metres (330 ft) long.

== Lines ==
The Tokyo Monorail station is served by the Tokyo Monorail Haneda Airport Line between Monorail Hamamatsuchō in central Tokyo and Haneda Airport Terminal 2. The TWR station is served by the underground TWR Rinkai Line between Ōsaki and Shin-Kiba, with many through trains continuing to and from the East Japan Railway Company (JR East) Saikyō Line and Kawagoe Line.

== Tokyo Monorail Haneda Airport Line ==
=== Platforms ===
The monorail station has two unnumbered elevated side platforms, and two sets of ticket barriers.

Tokyo Monorail Haneda Airport Line	for Ryūtsū Center, Haneda Airport Terminal 1, and Haneda Airport Terminal 2
Tokyo Monorail Haneda Airport Line	for Monorail Hamamatsuchō

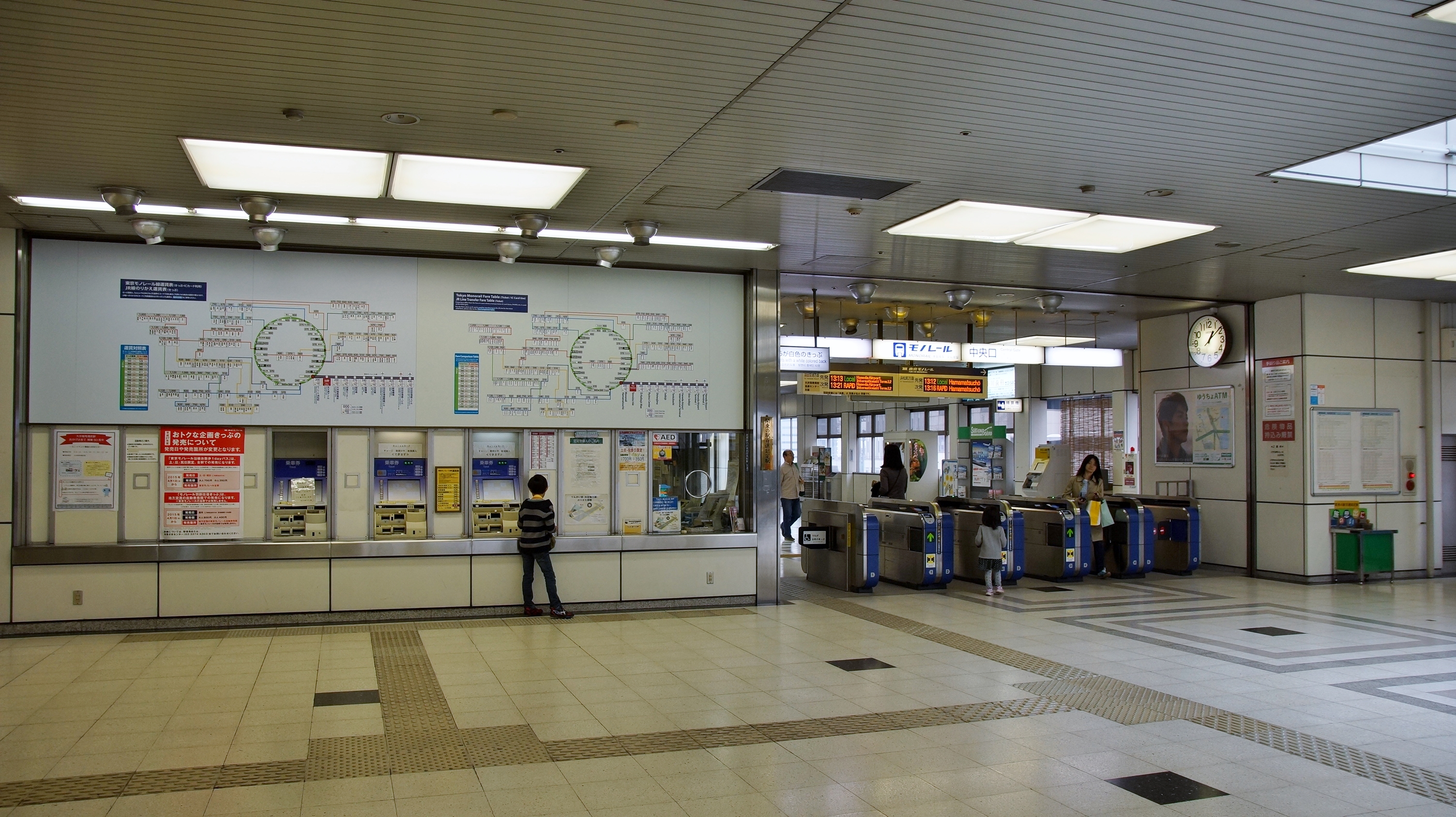
The ticket machines and ticket barriers, April 2015

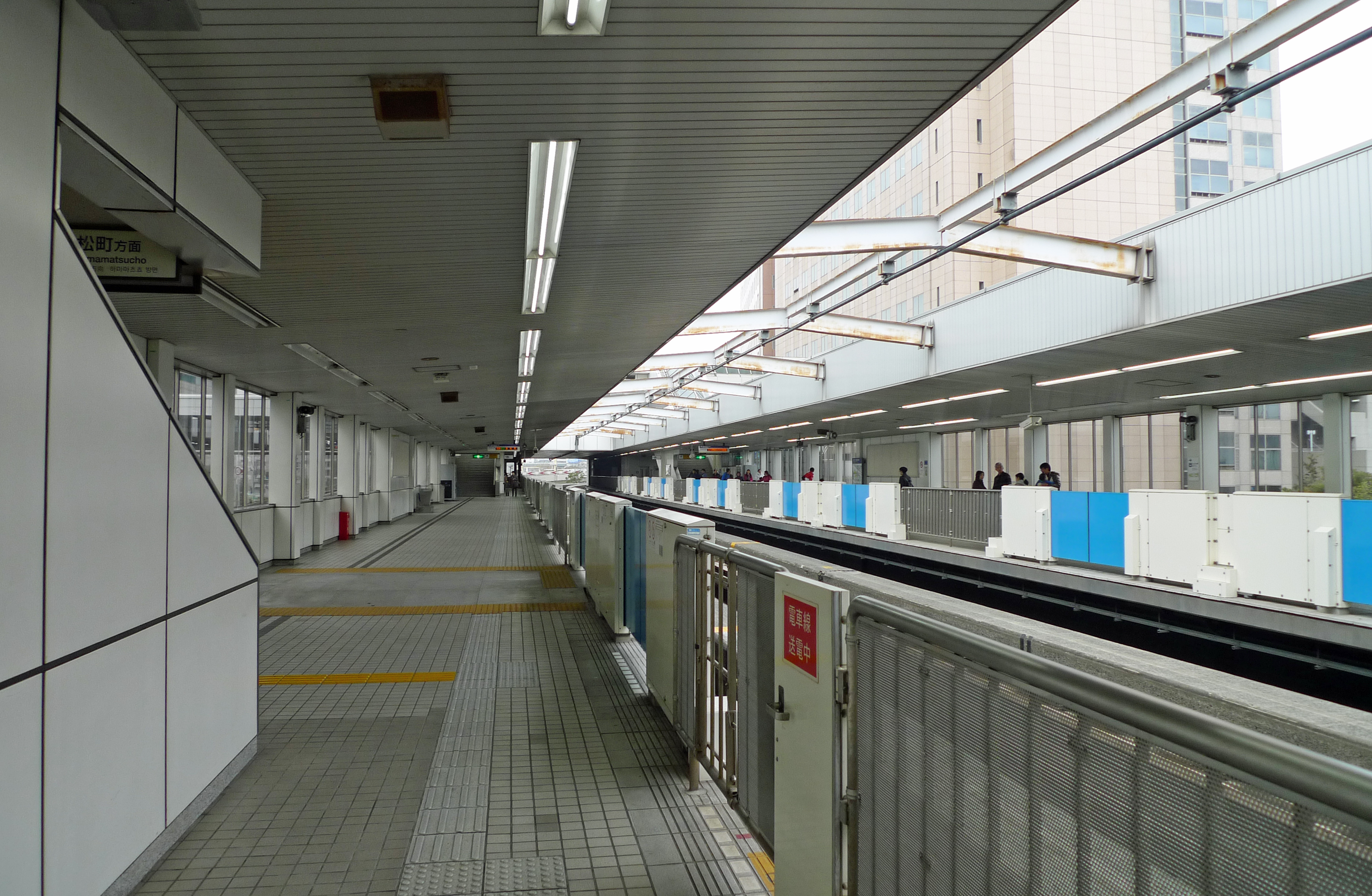
The platforms, February 2015

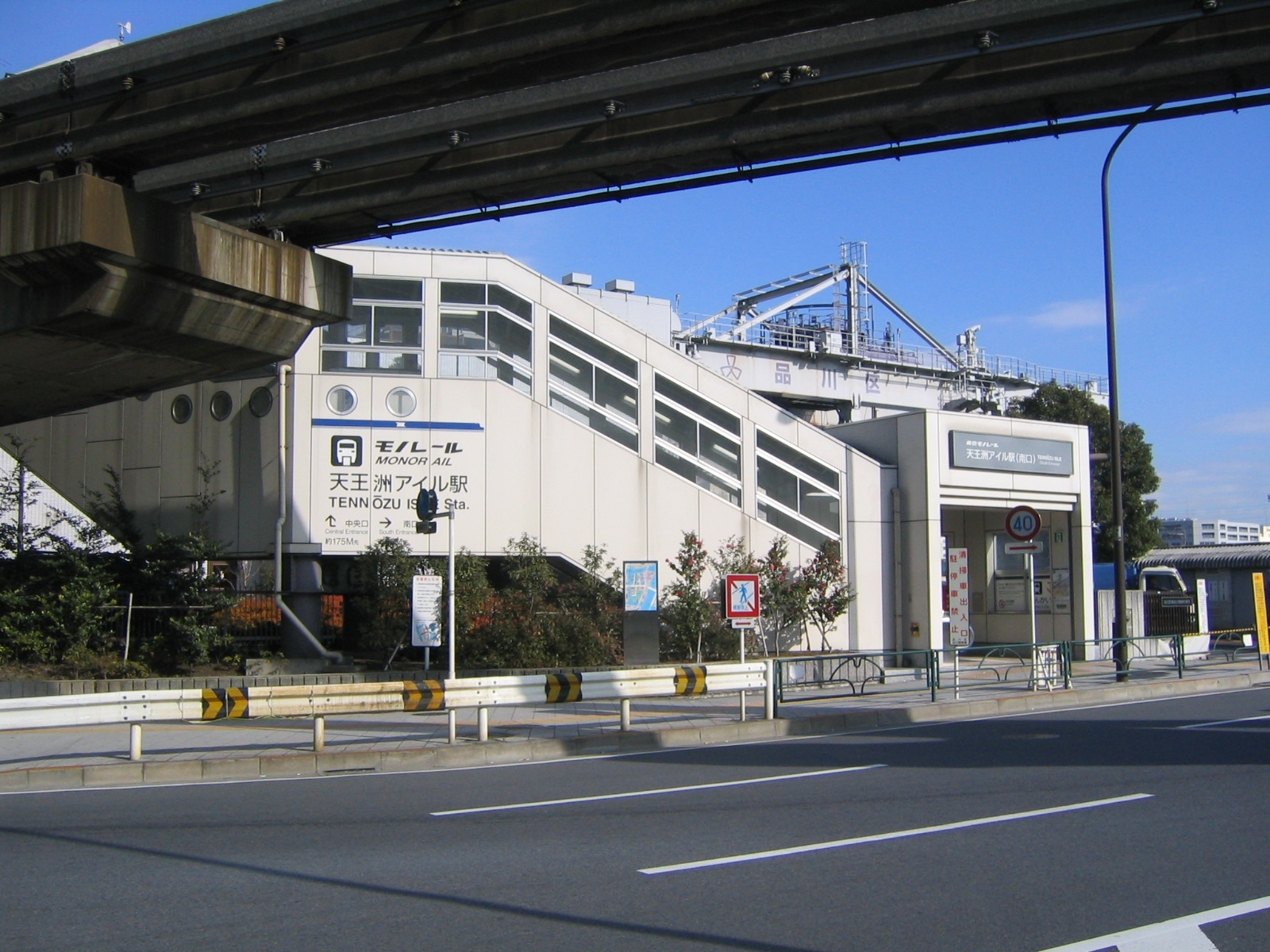
The Tokyo Monorail station south entrance, January 2005

== Tokyo Waterfront Rapid Transit ==
=== Platforms ===
The TWR station has an underground station concourse on the basement ("1BF") level, and a single island platform on the third-basement ("3BF") level, serving two tracks. There are three entrances to the station: "A", "B", and "C".

1	Rinkai Line	for Ōsaki; Saikyō and Kawagoe Lines for Shinjuku, Ōmiya, and Kawagoe
2	Rinkai Line	for Tokyo Teleport and Shin-Kiba

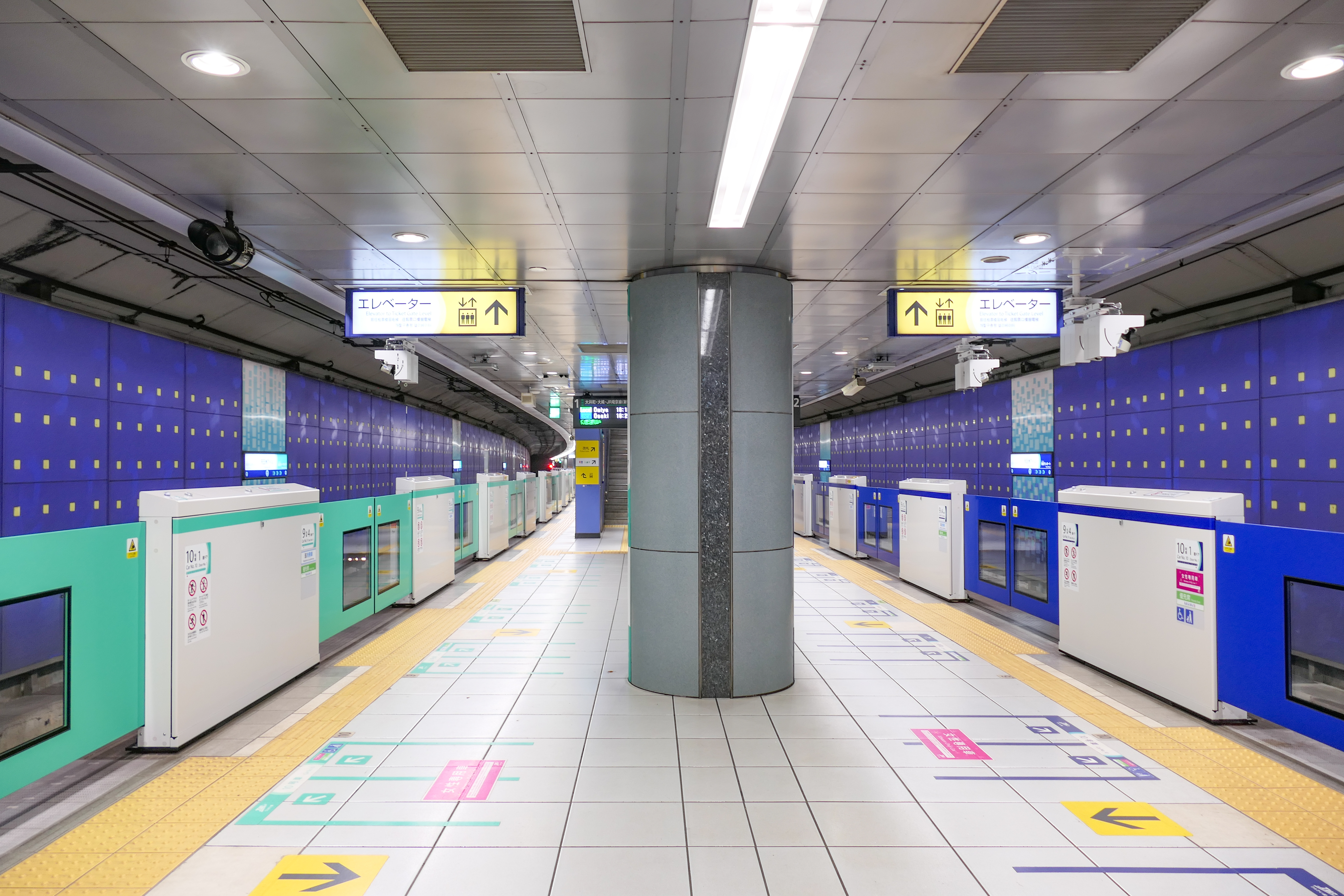
The platforms, March 2022

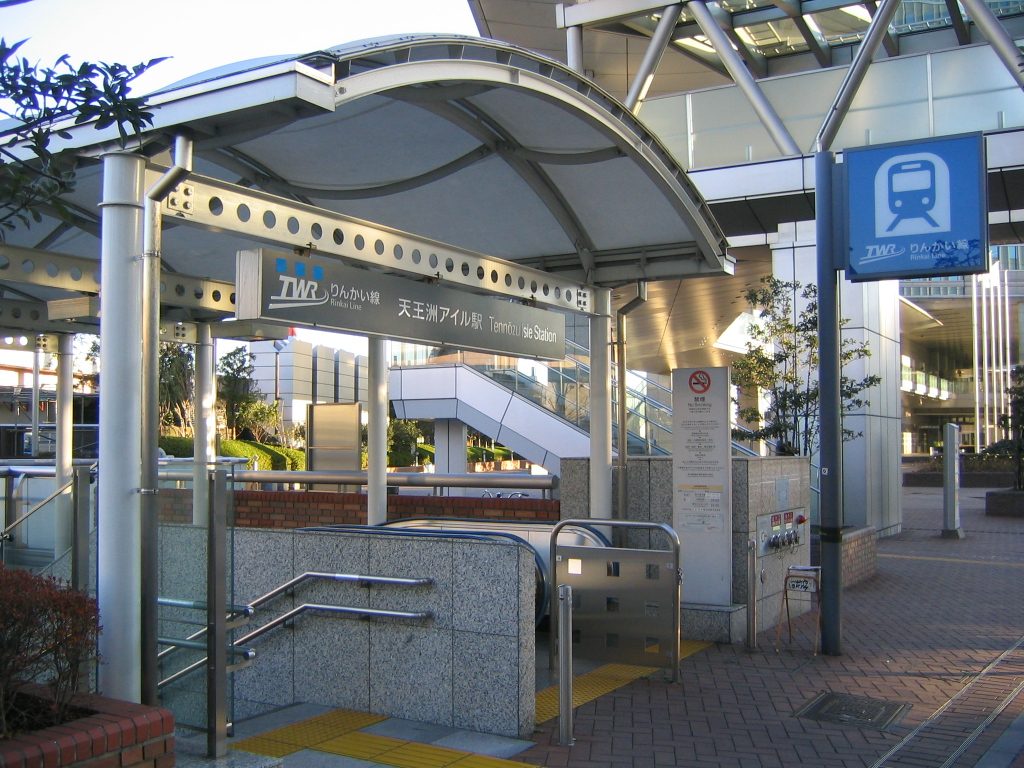
Entrance A to the Rinkai Line station, January 2005

== History ==
The Tokyo Monorail station opened on 19 June 1992. The TWR Rinkai Line station opened on 31 March 2001.

Station numbering was introduced to the Rinkai Line platforms in 2016 with Tennōzu Isle being assigned station number R05.

== Passenger statistics ==
In fiscal 2011, the Tokyo Monorail station was used by an average of 26,651 passengers daily, and the TWR station was used by 15,513 passengers daily.

== Surrounding area ==
- The Tennōzu Isle area
- Tokyo Immigration Bureau
- Sea Fort Square
- NYK Tennoz Building
  - Marza Animation Planet Headquarters
- Daiichi Hotel Tokyo Sea Fort

== See also ==
- List of railway stations in Japan
