= Tokyo Teleport Station =

Railway station in Tokyo, Japan

R04 Tokyo Teleport Station 東京テレポート駅
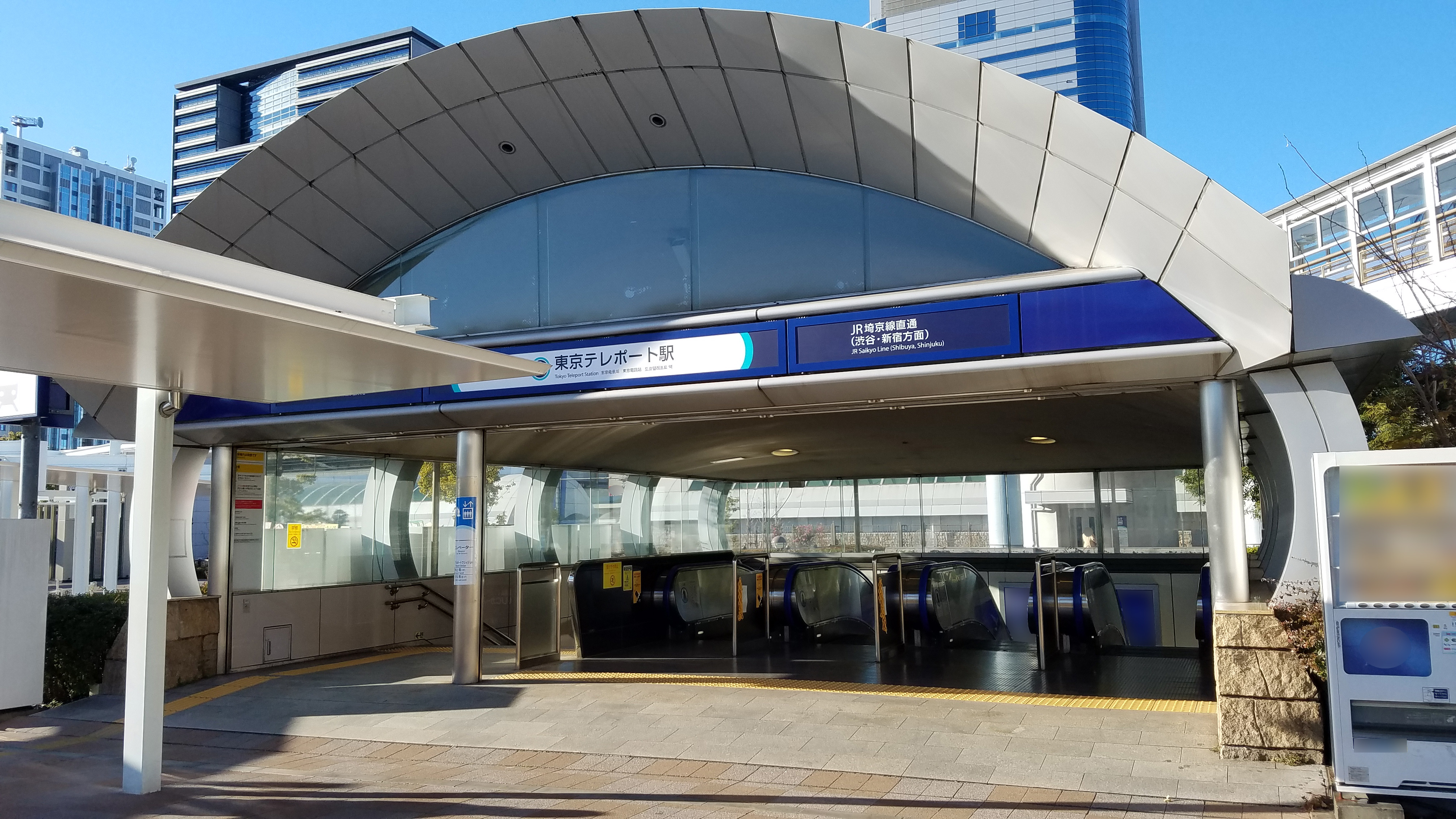
- The "A" entrance to the underground station in January 2022

General information
- Location: Kōtō, Tokyo; Japan
- Coordinates: 35°37′39″N 139°46′44″E
- Operator: Tokyo Waterfront Area Rapid Transit
- Line: Rinkai Line
- Distance: 4.9 km (3.0 mi) from Shin-Kiba
- Platforms: 1 island platform
- Tracks: 2
- Connections: Bus terminal

Construction
- Structure type: Underground

Other information
- Station code: R04
- Website: Official website

History
- Opened: 30 March 1996; 30 years ago

Passengers
- FY2024: 23,181 daily
- Rank: 5 out of 8

Services
Preceding station	Tokyo Waterfront Area Rapid Transit	Following station
Tennōzu Isle R05 towards Ōsaki	Rinkai Line	Kokusai-Tenjijō R03 towards Shin-Kiba
Location
- Location within Special wards of Tokyo Location within Tokyo Location within Japan

Tokyo Teleport Station (Japanese: 東京テレポート駅, Hepburn: Tōkyō Terepōto eki) is an underground railway station on the Rinkai Line in Kōtō, Tokyo, Japan, operated by Tokyo Waterfront Area Rapid Transit (TWR).

== Lines ==
Tokyo Teleport Station is served by the Rinkai Line from Ōsaki to Shin-Kiba. The station is situated between Tennōzu Isle and Kokusai-Tenjijō stations, and is 4.9 km (3.0 mi) from the starting point of the Rinkai Line at Shin-Kiba.

== Services ==
Many trains inter-run over the JR East Saikyo Line and Kawagoe Line to Kawagoe in Saitama Prefecture.

== Station layout ==
The station has a single underground island platform serving two tracks.

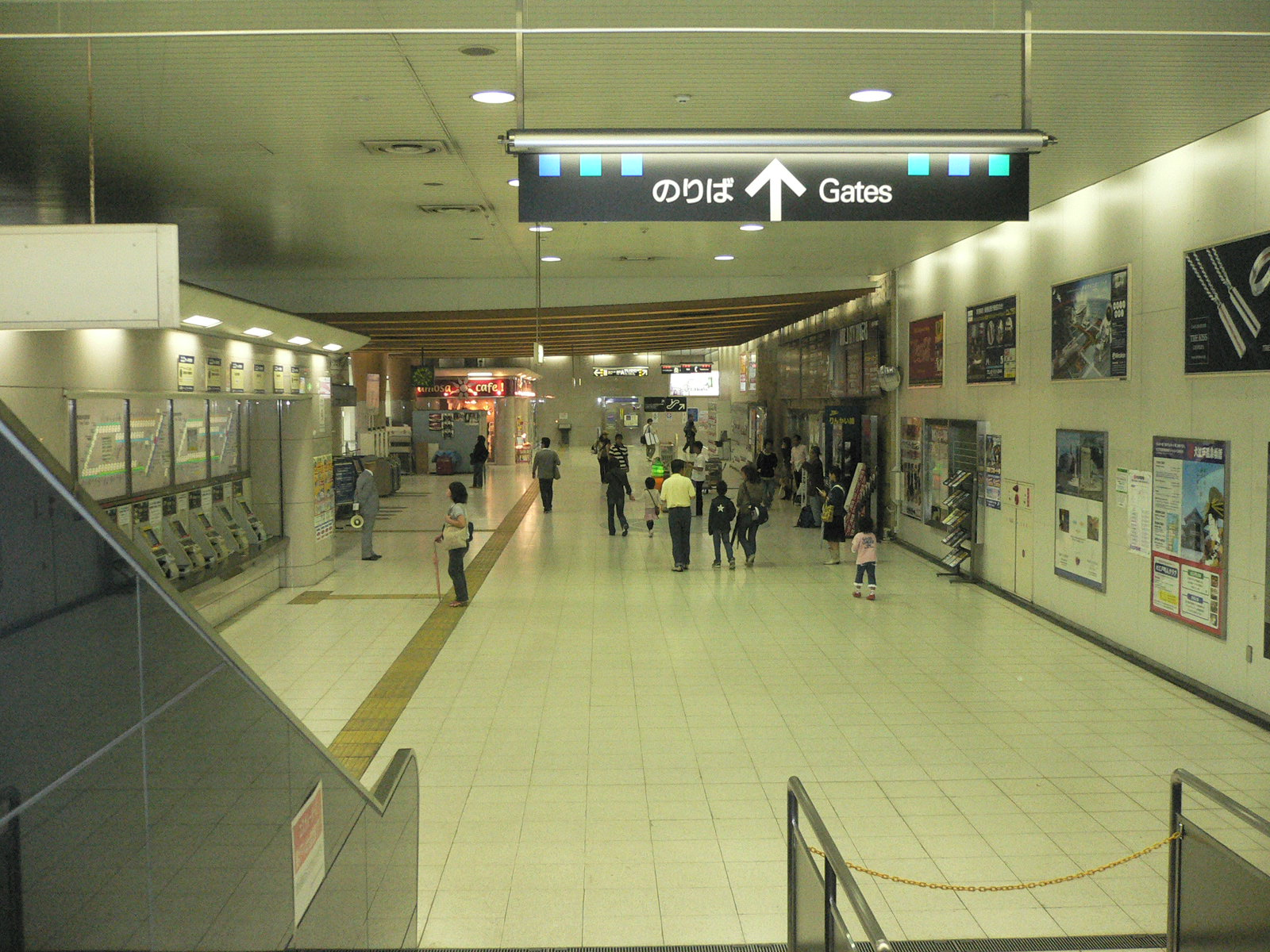
The station concourse in October 2005

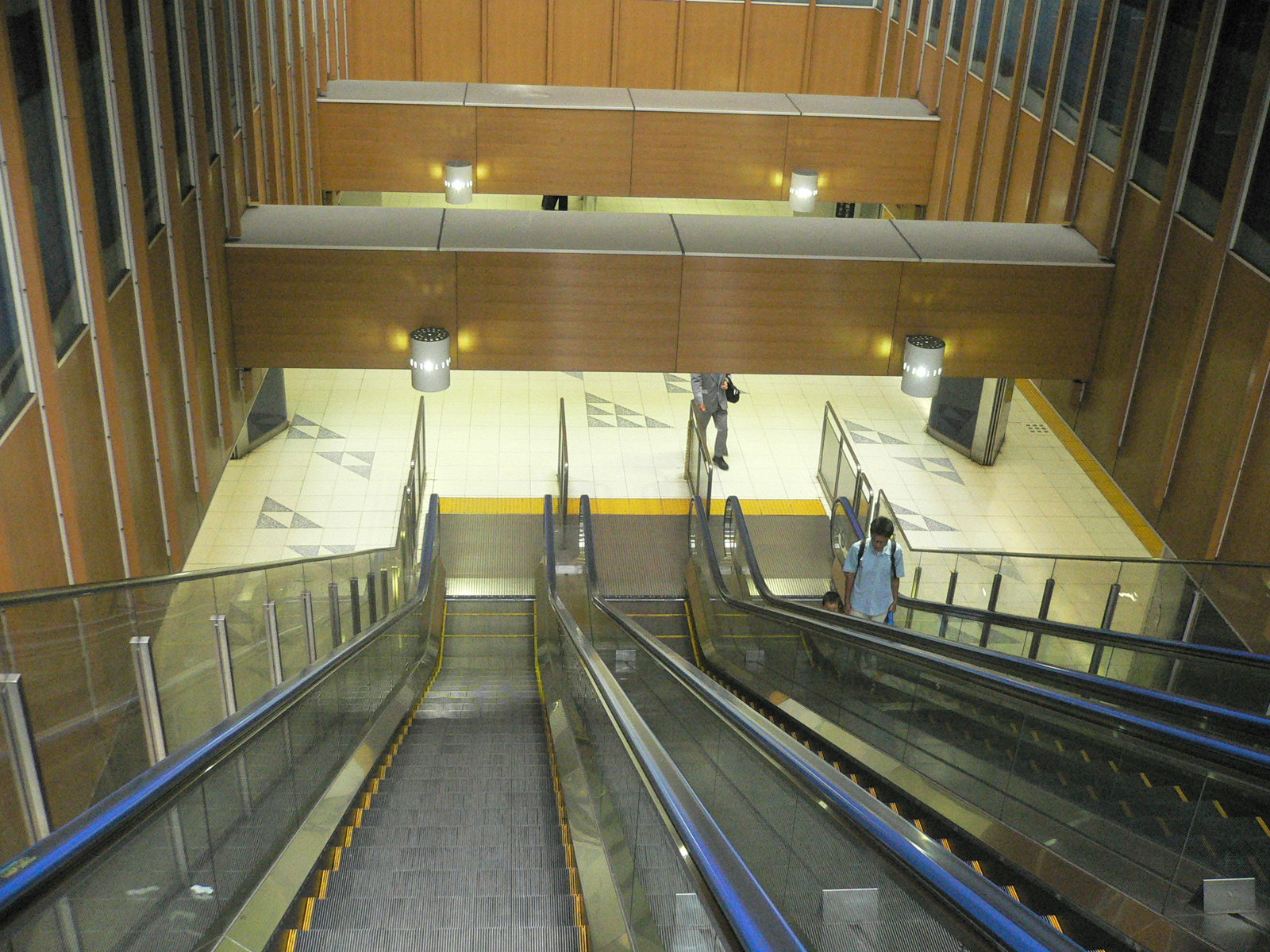
The escalators connecting to the platform in October 2005

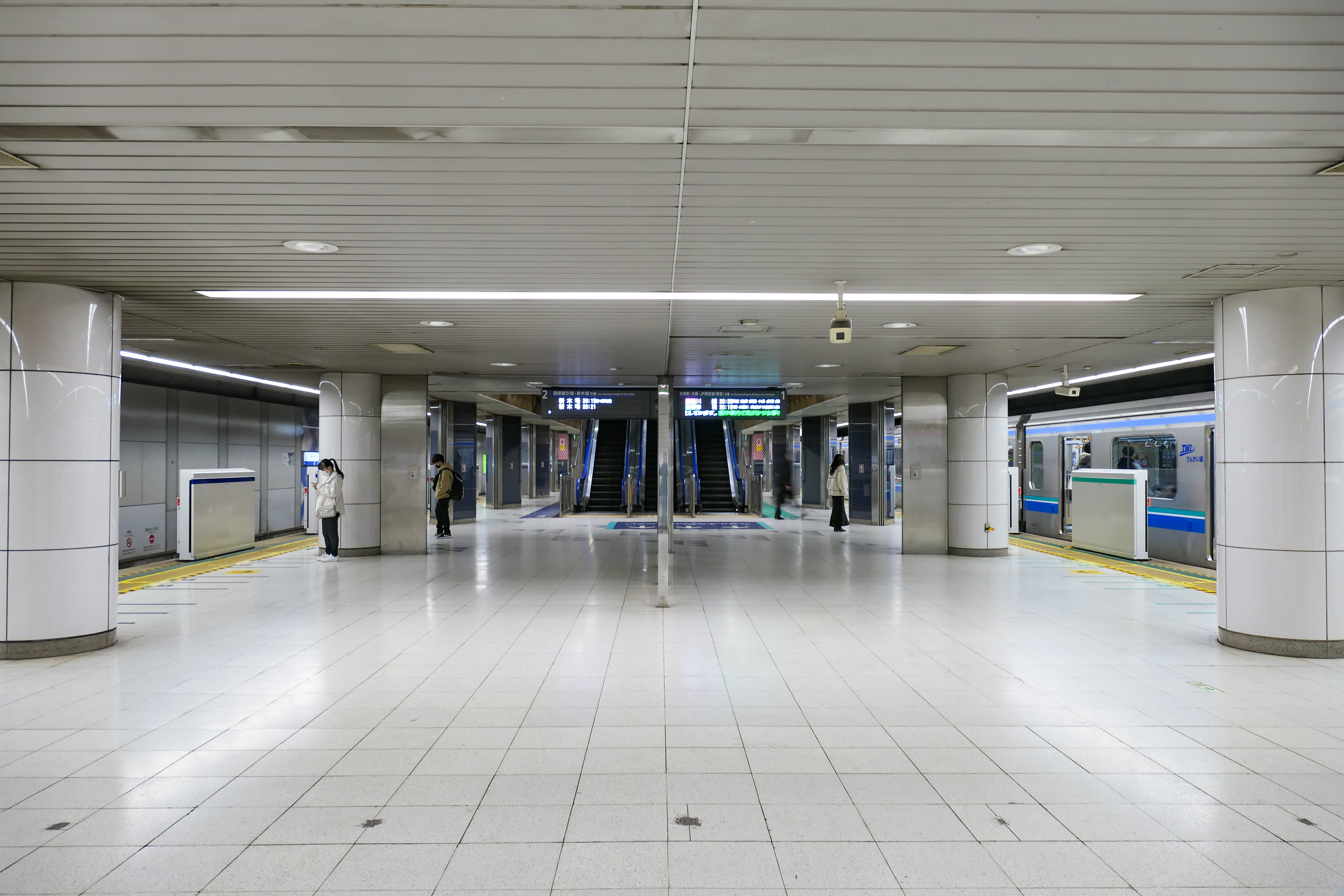
The platform in February 2023

== History ==
The station opened on 30 March 1996, and initially formed the terminus of the line from Shin-Kiba before it was extended to Osaki.

Station numbering was introduced in 2016 with Tokyo Teleport being assigned station number R04.

== Surrounding area ==
There is a bus station adjacent, which serves as the terminus to three routes (two of which are numbered 01, preceded by a kanji character). The more regular service runs to Monzen-nakacho Station on the Tokyo Metro Tozai Line and the Toei Oedo Line.

Attractions, including shopping centres, in the vicinity include:

- Miraikan
- Museum of Maritime Science
- Odaiba Kaihin Park
- Fuji TV Headquarters
- Tokyo International Exchange Center
- Decks Tokyo Beach
- Aqua City Odaiba
- DiverCity Tokyo
- Palette Town
  - Zepp Tokyo
  - Venus Fort
  - Meg@web (Toyota's exhibition hall, including a small motor museum)
  - Daikanransha
- Toyota Arena Tokyo

The Odaiba-Kaihinkōen and Aomi stations of the Yurikamome are both within walking distance of the station.

== Bus terminal ==
=== Long-distance buses ===
- Skytree Shuttle; For Kinshichō Station and Tokyo Skytree
- For Tsukuba Station and Tsuchiura Station
- For Kashimajingū Station
- For Yokohama Station
- For Haneda Airport
- Fantasia Nagoya; For Hoshigaoka Station, Motoyama Station, Chikusa Station, Sakae Station, and Nagoya Station

== See also ==
- List of railway stations in Japan
