= Tokyo Metro 08 series =

Japanese train type

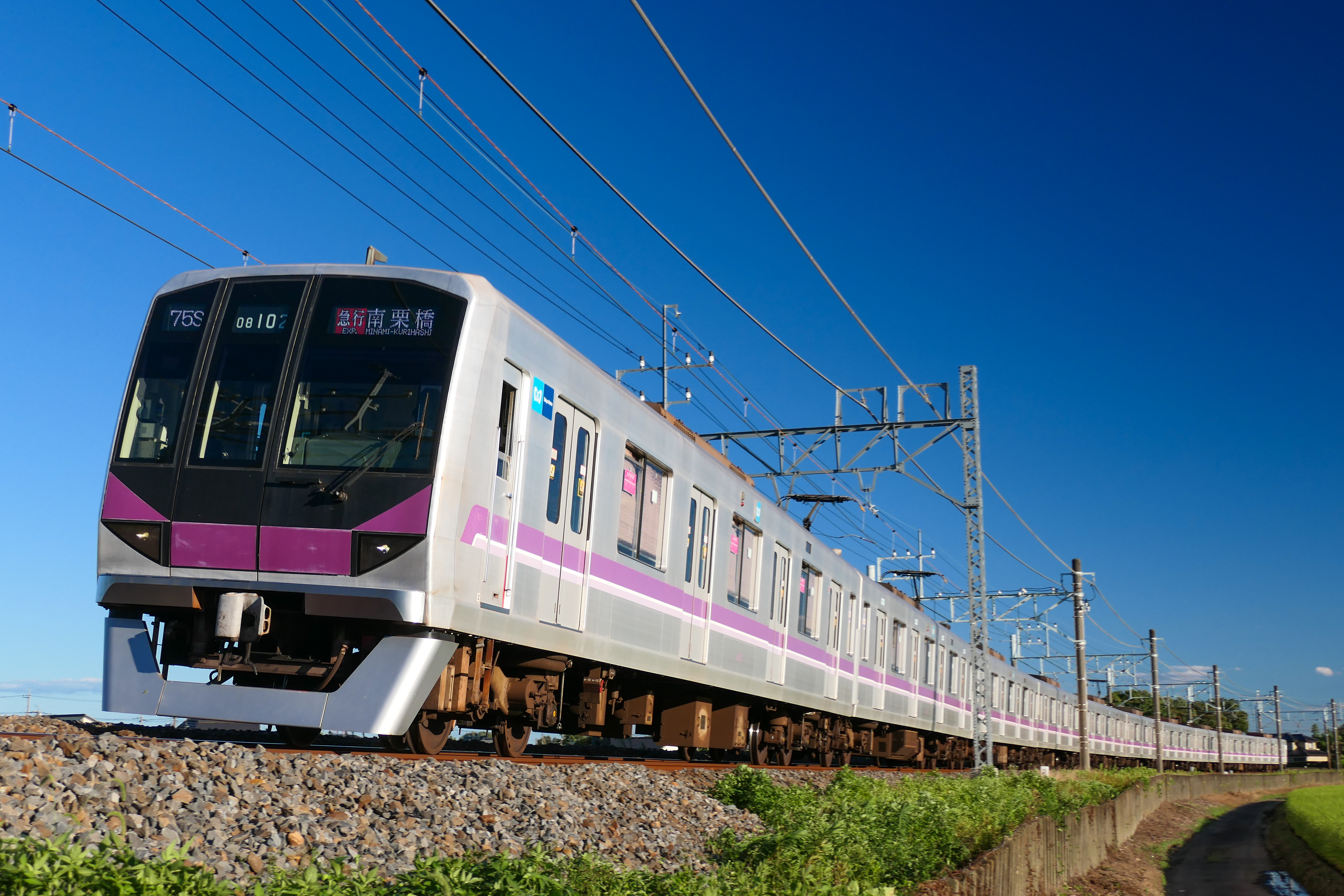
- Tokyo Metro 08 series on the Tobu Nikkō Line in August 2021
- In service: 2003–present
- Manufacturer: Nippon Sharyo
- Constructed: 2002–2003
- Entered service: 7 January 2003
- Refurbished: February 2018
- Number built: 60 vehicles (6 sets)
- Number in service: 60 vehicles (6 sets)
- Formation: 10 cars per trainset
- Fleet numbers: 51–56
- Capacity: 1,500 total, 522 seating
- Operator: Tokyo Metro (previously TRTA)
- Depot: Saginuma
- Lines served: Tokyo Metro Hanzōmon Line; Tokyu Den-en-toshi Line; Tobu Skytree Line; Tobu Nikkō Line; Tobu Isesaki Line

Specifications
- Car body construction: Aluminium
- Car length: 20,320 mm (66 ft 8 in) (end cars); 20,000 mm (65 ft 7 in) (intermediate cars)
- Width: 2,780 mm (9 ft 1 in)
- Height: 4,022 mm (13 ft 2 in)
- Doors: 4 pairs per side
- Maximum speed: 110 km/h (68 mph)
- Weight: 269.6 t
- Traction system: Variable frequency (IGBT)
- Power output: 165 kW × 4
- Transmission: Westinghouse Natal (WN) drive; Gear ratio: 6.21 : 1
- Acceleration: 3.3 km/(h⋅s) (2.1 mph/s)
- Deceleration: 3.5 km/(h⋅s) (2.2 mph/s) (in service); 4.5 km/(h⋅s) (2.8 mph/s) (emergency)
- Electric systems: 1,500 V DC overhead catenary
- Current collection: Pantograph
- Bogies: ND730 (motored), ND730T (trailer)
- Braking system: Electronically controlled pneumatic brakes with TRT-11 type regenerative braking
- Safety systems: Tokyo Metro CS-ATC, Tokyu CS-ATC, Tobu ATS
- Coupling system: Janney coupler
- Track gauge: 1,067 mm (3 ft 6 in)

The Tokyo Metro 08 series (東京メトロ08系, Tōkyō Metoro 08-kei) is an electric multiple unit (EMU) train type operated on the Tokyo Metro Hanzōmon Line in Tokyo, Japan since 2003. Introduced into service on 7 January 2003, a total of six ten-car trainsets were manufactured by Nippon Sharyo between 2002 and 2003 to augment the 8000 series trains following the extension to Oshiage.

== Description ==
The Tokyo Metro 08 series was introduced into service on 7 January 2003 to increase capacity on the Hanzōmon Line, ahead of its extension from Suitengumae to Oshiage in March of that year. The train type is also used on through services to the Tokyu Den-en-toshi Line and the Tobu Isesaki and Nikko Lines. The 08 series was the last new rolling stock type purchased by TRTA before its privatization the following year.

== Formations ==
As of 1 April 2017, the fleet consists of six ten-car sets, numbered 51 to 56, formed as shown below, with five motored (M) cars and five trailer (T) cars. Car 1 is at the Oshiage end.

Car No.	1	2	3	4	5	6	7	8	9	10
Designation	CT1	M1	M2	T	Mc1	Tc	T'	M1	M2	CT2
Numbering	08-100	08-200	08-300	08-400	08-500	08-600	08-700	08-800	08-900	08-000
Weight (t)	23.7	31.3	32.1	21.6	30.8	21.5	21.5	31.3	32.1	23.7
Capacity (total/seated)	141/48	152/54	153/51	152/54	152/54	152/54	152/54	152/54	153/51	141/48

- Cars 2 and 8 each have two single-arm pantographs, and car 5 is fitted with one.
- Wheelchair spaces are provided in cars 3 and 9.
- Car 2 is designated as a moderately air-conditioned car.

== Interior ==
Passenger accommodation consists of longitudinal bucket-style seating throughout. Beginning in 2014, the original LED information displays were replaced with LCD displays.

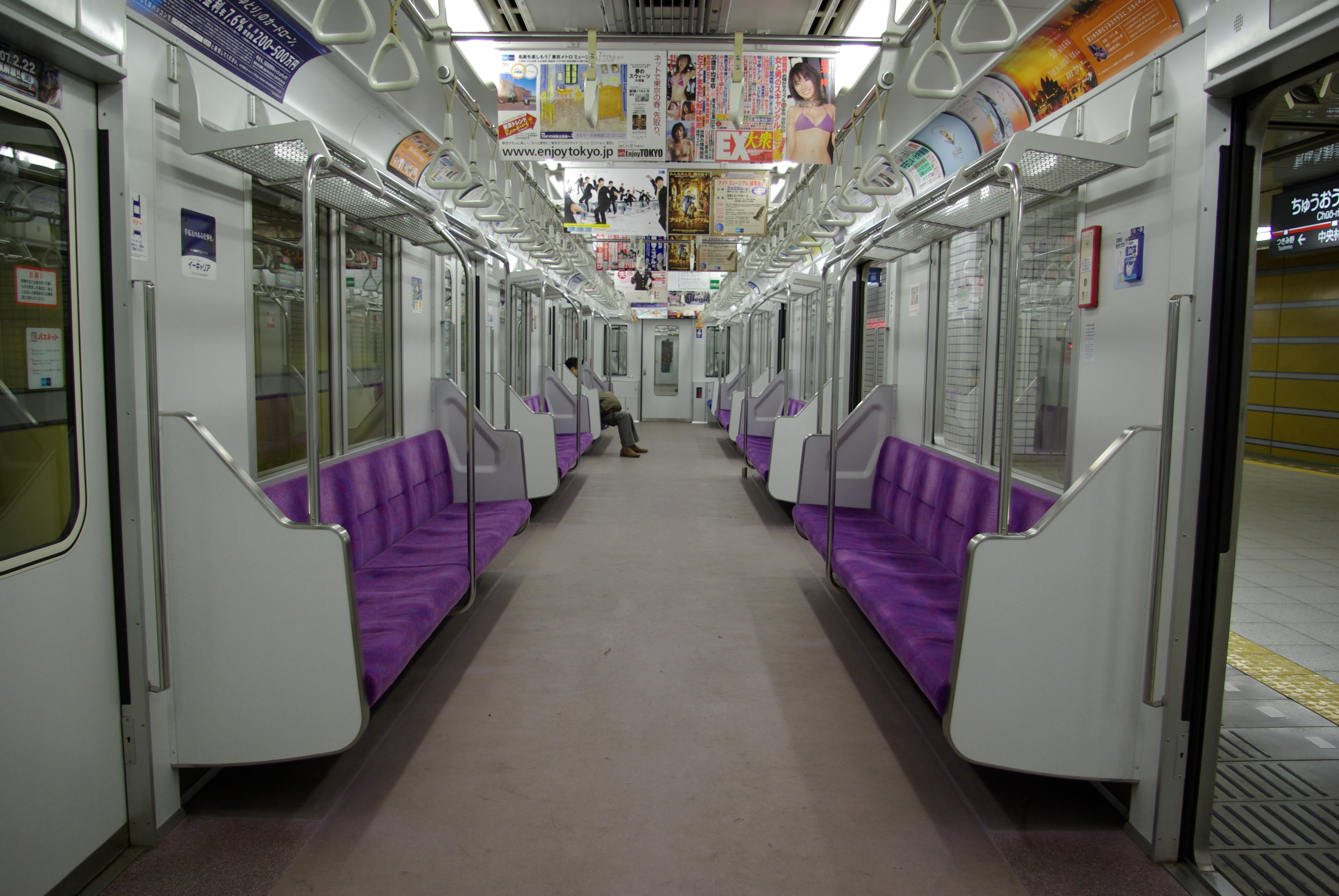
Interior view in February 2007

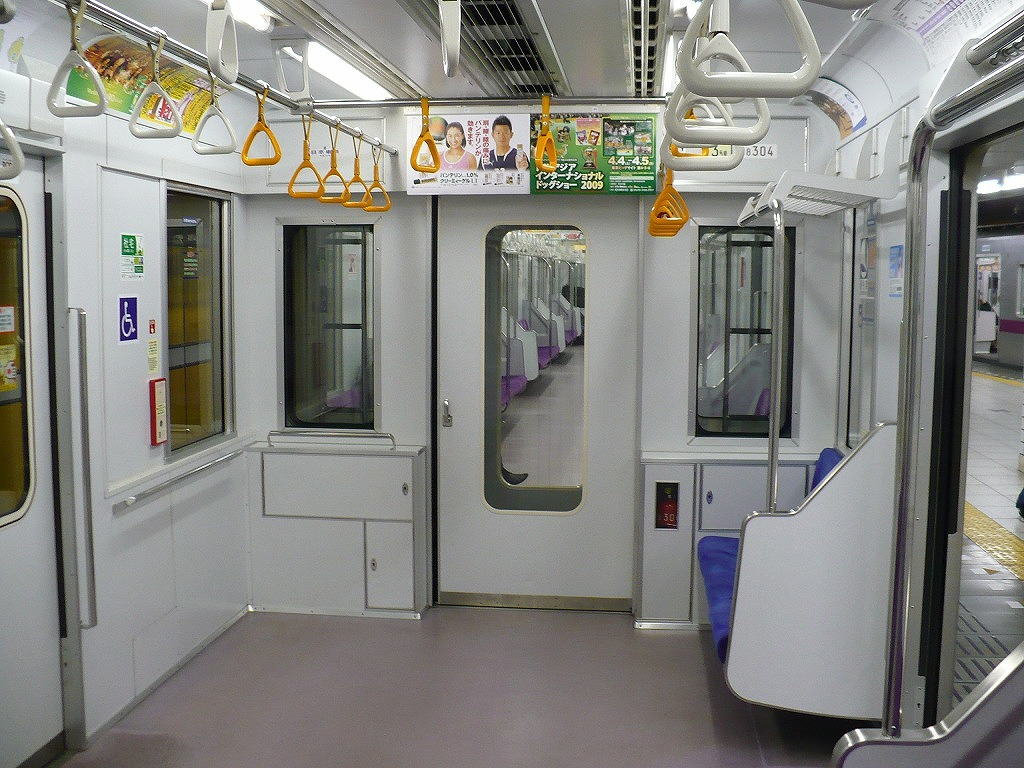
Wheelchair space

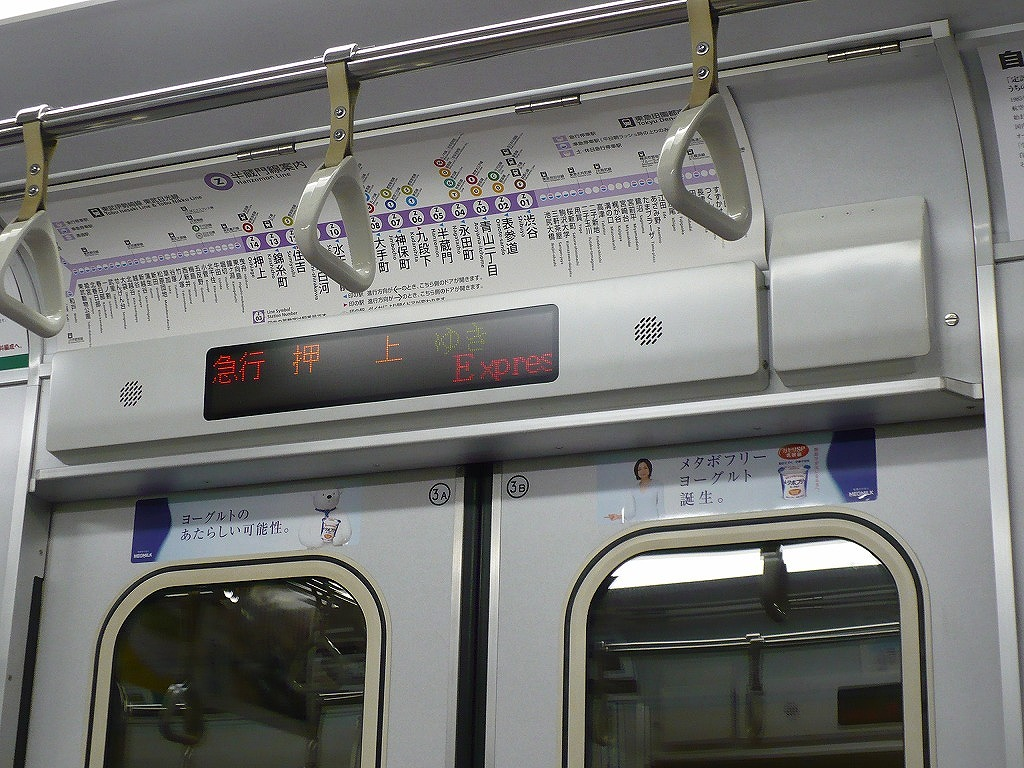
LED passenger information display

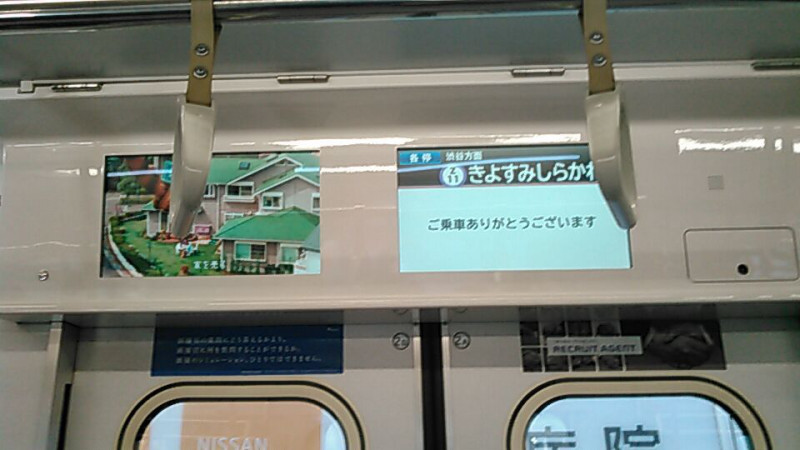
LCD passenger information display in January 2017

== Gallery ==
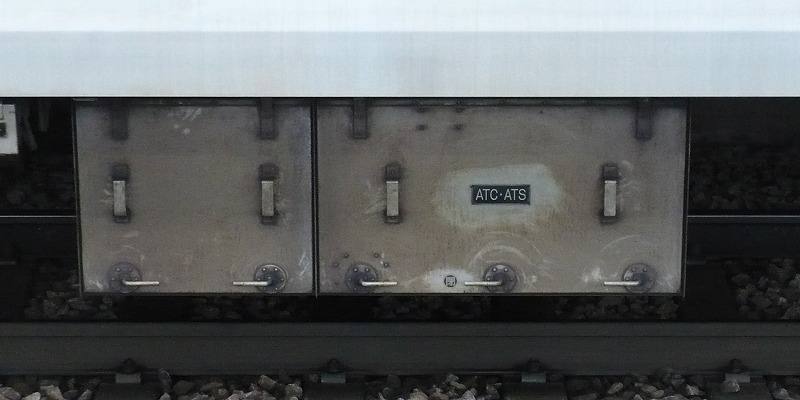
ATC equipment for the 08 series

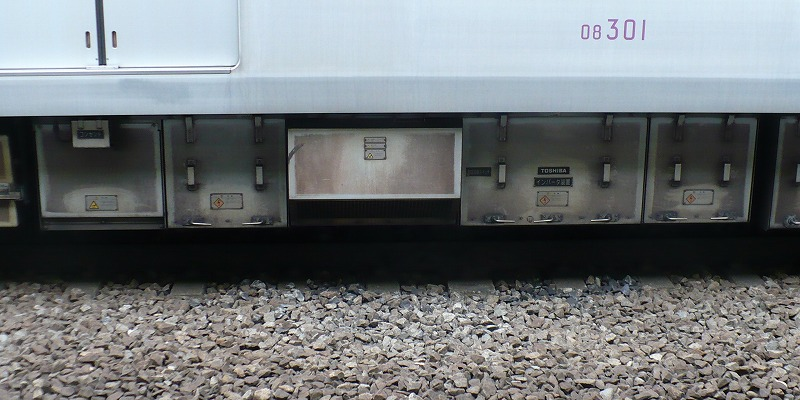
SIV auxiliary power supply for the 08 series

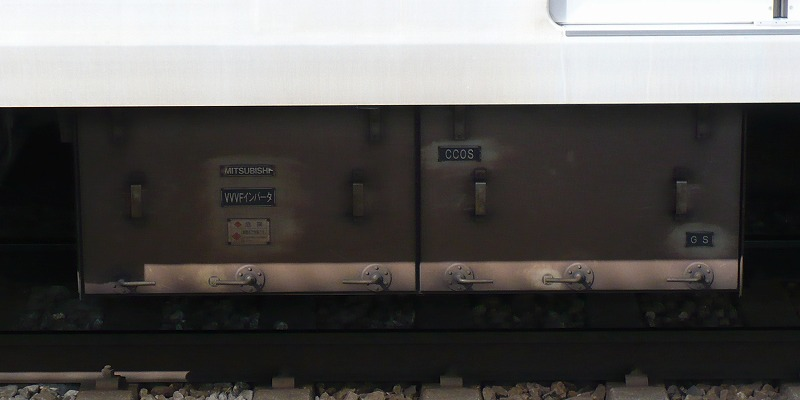
VVVF inverter of the 08 series

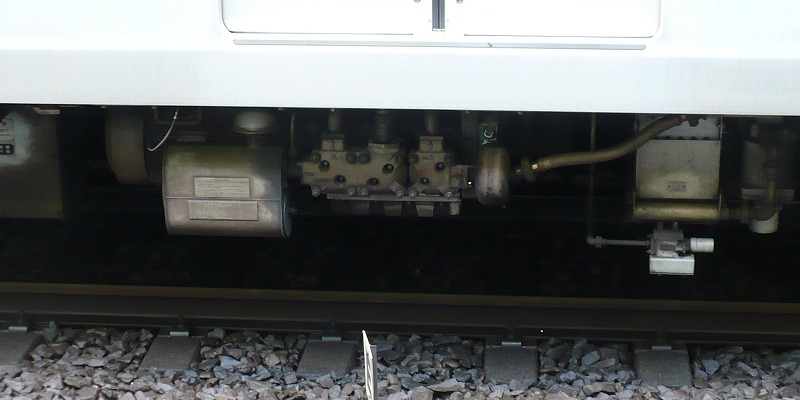
C2500LB air compressor for the 08 series

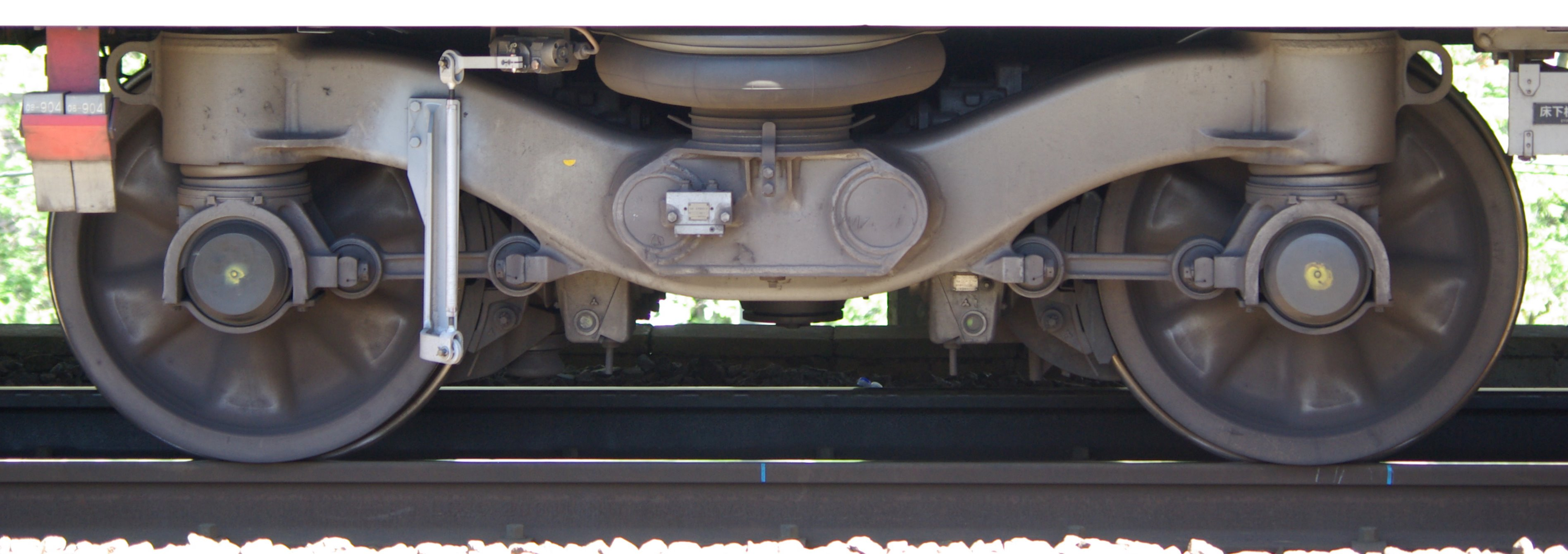
ND730 bogie of the 08 series

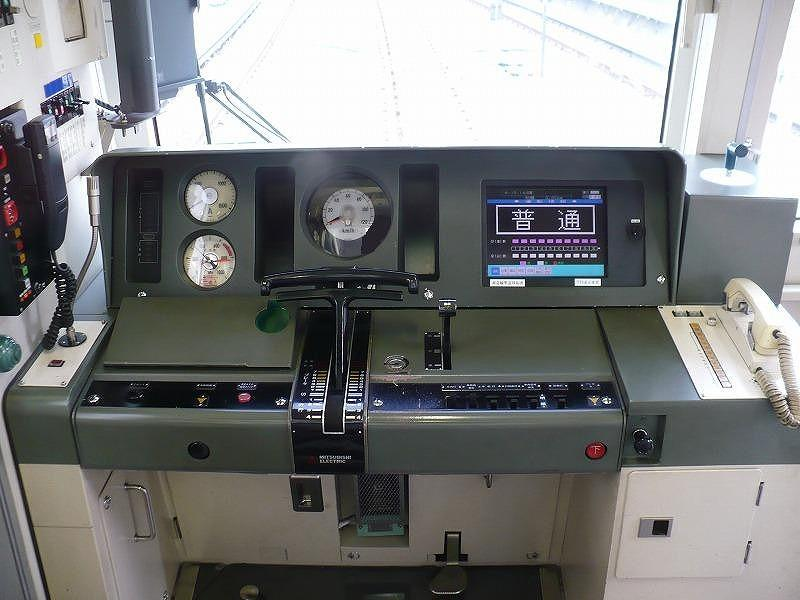
Driver's cab of the 08 series
