= Tokyo Metro 18000 series =

Japanese electric multiple unit train type

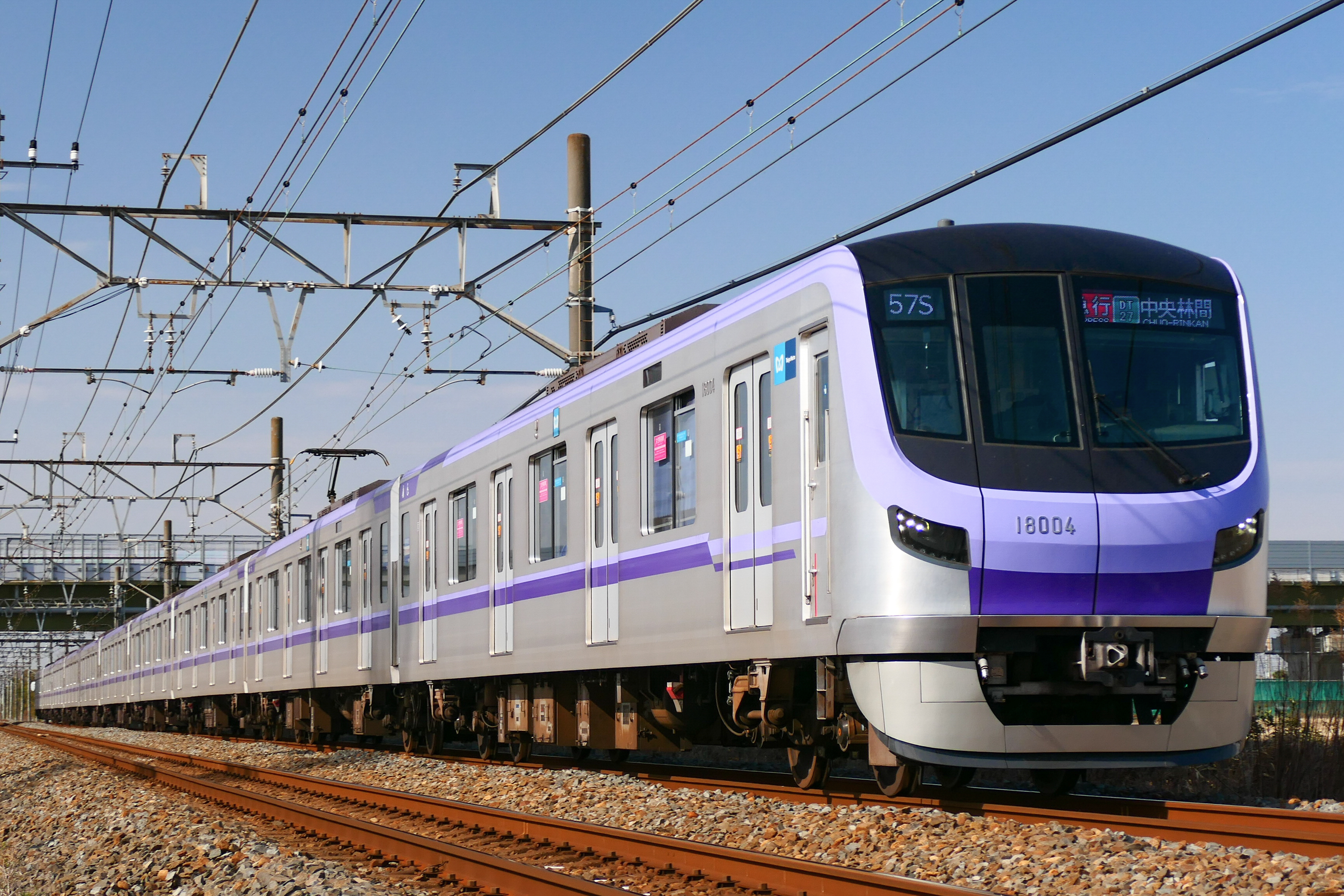
- A Hanzōmon Line 18000 series train
- In service: 2021–present
- Manufacturer: Hitachi
- Built at: Kudamatsu, Yamaguchi
- Family name: A-train
- Replaced: 8000 series
- Constructed: 2020–2025
- Entered service: 7 August 2021
- Number built: 190 vehicles (19 sets)
- Number in service: 190 vehicles (19 sets) (as of 5 January 2026)
- Formation: 10 cars per trainset
- Fleet numbers: 18101–18119
- Operator: Tokyo Metro
- Depot: Saginuma
- Lines served: Hanzōmon Line; Den-en-toshi Line; Tobu Skytree Line; Isesaki Line; Nikkō Line

Specifications
- Car body construction: Aluminium alloy double-skinned construction
- Car length: 20.005 m (65 ft 7.6 in) (end cars); 19.5 m (64 ft 0 in) (intermediate cars)
- Width: 2.78 m (9 ft 1 in) (normal); 2.828 m (9 ft 3.3 in) (between car side lights); 2.786 m (9 ft 1.7 in) (slip)
- Height: 3.635 m (11 ft 11.1 in) (normal; 4.022 m (13 ft 2.3 in) (including aircon unit); 4.08 m (13 ft 5 in) (pantograph folding height)
- Floor height: 1.14 m (3 ft 9 in)
- Doors: 4 pairs per side
- Maximum speed: 120 km/h (75 mph) (design); 110 km/h (68 mph) (service)
- Weight: 298.4 t (293.7 long tons; 328.9 short tons)
- Traction system: Mitsubishi Electric MAP-214-15V336 PG-less 2-level SiC-MOSFET–VVVF inverter vector control
- Traction motors: 16 × totally enclosed Toshiba 205 kW (275 hp) permanent-magnet synchronous motor
- Power output: 3.28 MW (4,399 hp)
- Acceleration: 0.92 m/s^{2} (2.1 mph/s)
- Deceleration: 0.97 m/s^{2} (2.2 mph/s) (service); 1.3 m/s^{2} (2.9 mph/s) (emergency)
- Electric systems: 1,500 V DC (overhead catenary)
- Current collection: Pantograph
- UIC classification: 2'2' + Bo'Bo' + 2'2' + Bo'Bo' + 2'2' + 2'2' + Bo'Bo' + 2'2' + Bo'Bo' + 2'2'
- Safety systems: Tokyo Metro CS-ATC, Tokyu CS-ATC, Tobu ATS
- Coupling system: Shibata
- Track gauge: 1,067 mm (3 ft 6 in)

The Tokyo Metro 18000 series (東京メトロ18000系, Tōkyō Metoro 18000-kei) is an electric multiple unit (EMU) train type operated Tokyo Metro on the Hanzomon Line in Japan. Introduced into service on 7 August 2021, a total of 19 ten-car trainsets are being manufactured by Hitachi Rail from 2020 to replace the aging Tokyo Metro 8000 series currently in service on the Hanzomon Line.

== Formations ==
The 18000 series fleet is formed as follows:

	← Oshiage Shibuya →									
Car No.	1	2	3	4	5	6	7	8	9	10
Designation	18100 (CT1)	18200 (M)	18300 (T)	18400 (M)	18500 (Tc1)	18600 (Tc2)	18700 (M)	18800 (T')	18900 (M)	18000 (CT2)
Capacity	142/45	153/51	153/51	153/51	153/51	153/51	153/51	153/51	153/51	142/45
Weight (t)	28.5	32.6	26.7	32.8	29.1	28.2	32.8	26.7	32.6	28.4
Numbering	18101 :	18201 :	18301 :	18401 :	18501 :	18601 :	18701 :	18801 :	18901 :	18001 :

The "M" cars are each equipped with one single-arm pantograph.

== Interior ==
Passenger accommodation consists of longitudinal bench seating throughout. Wheelchair and stroller spaces are provided in all cars. The interior also includes security cameras. The floor height is 1,140 mm (45 in), 60 mm (2 in) lower than that of the 8000 series.

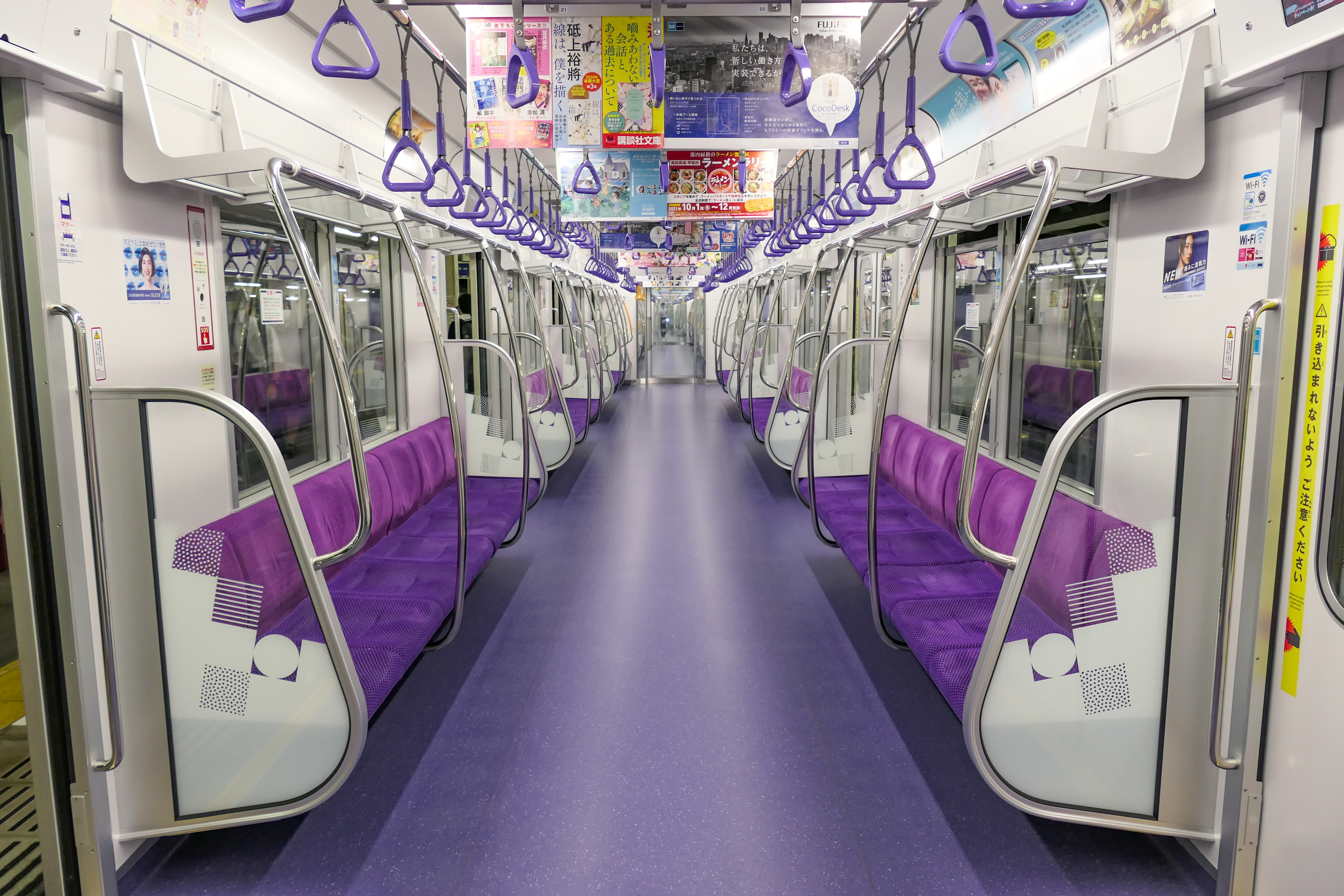
Interior view, October 2021

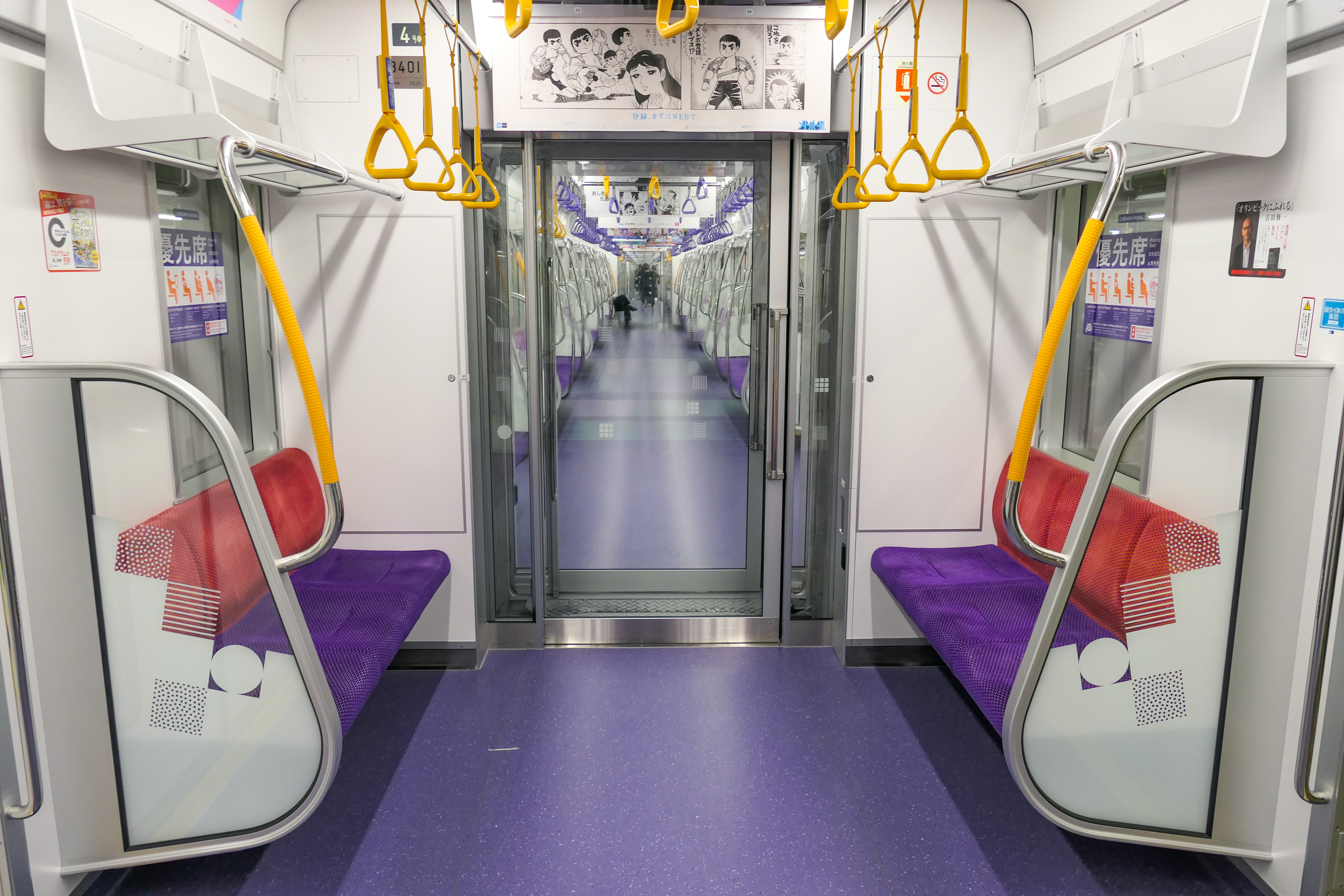
Priority seating, October 2021

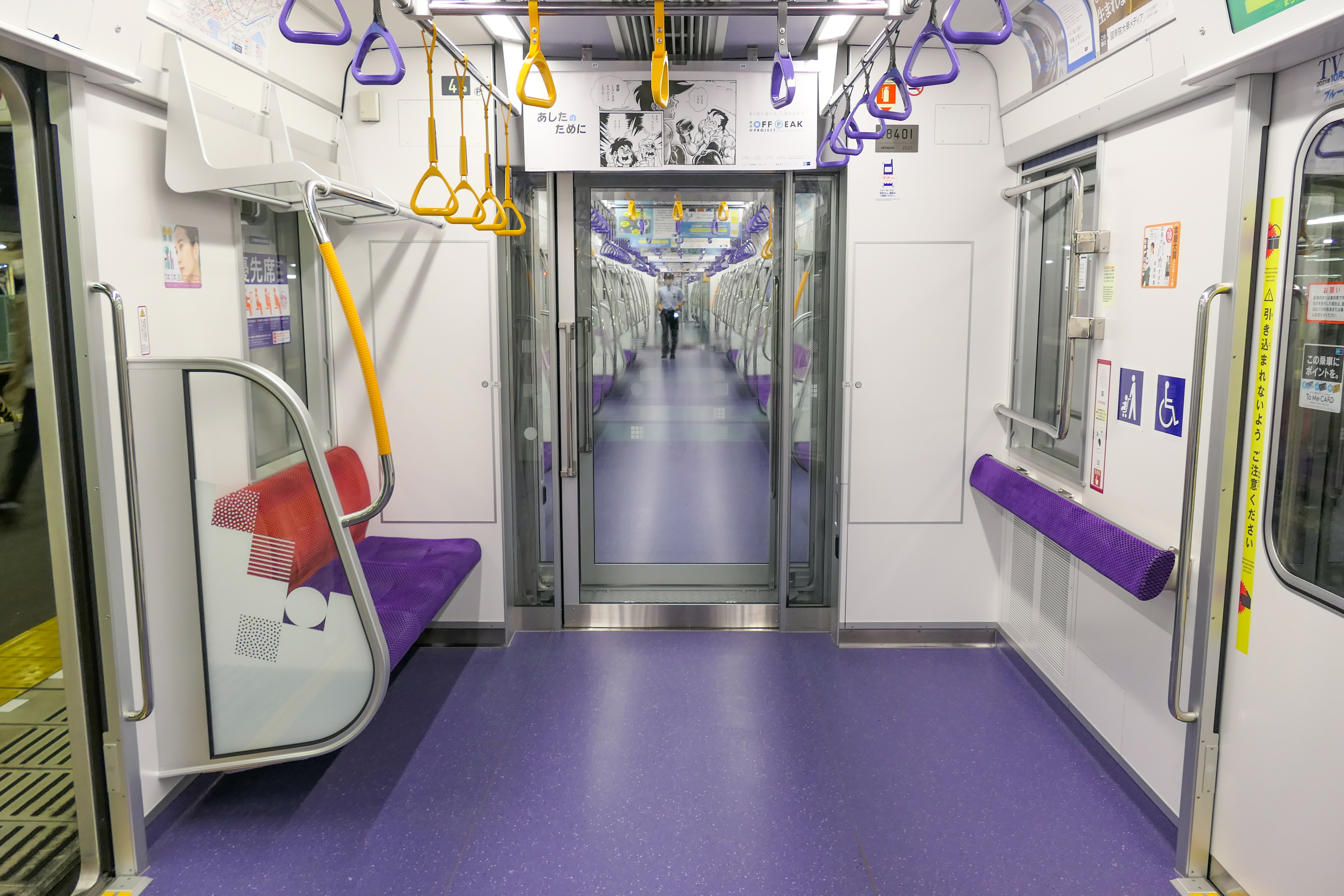
Priority seating with wheelchair/stroller space, October 2021

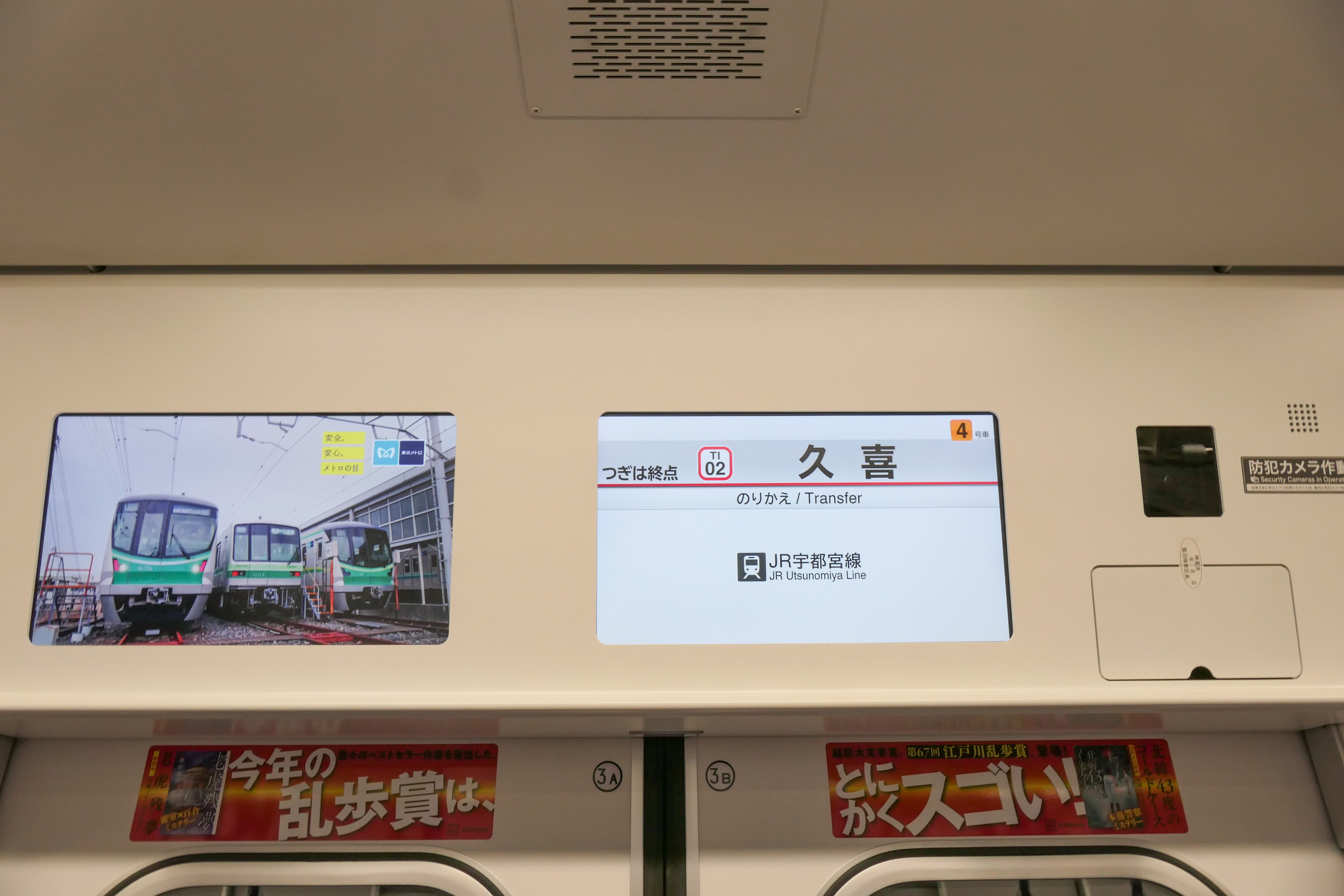
LCD passenger information displays and security cameras above passenger doorways, October 2021

== History ==
In March 2019, Tokyo Metro announced a plan to introduce new rolling stock, including the 18000 series. The 18000 series are planned to replace the 8000 series, which have been in service since 1981.

Delivery of the first set began in October 2020. A second set was delivered from Hitachi's Kasado plant in December 2020.

The trains entered full revenue service on 7 August 2021.

On 20 October 2021, the train type received the Good Design Award. On 26 May 2022, the 18000 series, alongside the similar 17000 series, was awarded the Laurel Prize.
