= Hanzōmon Line =

Subway line in Tokyo, Japan

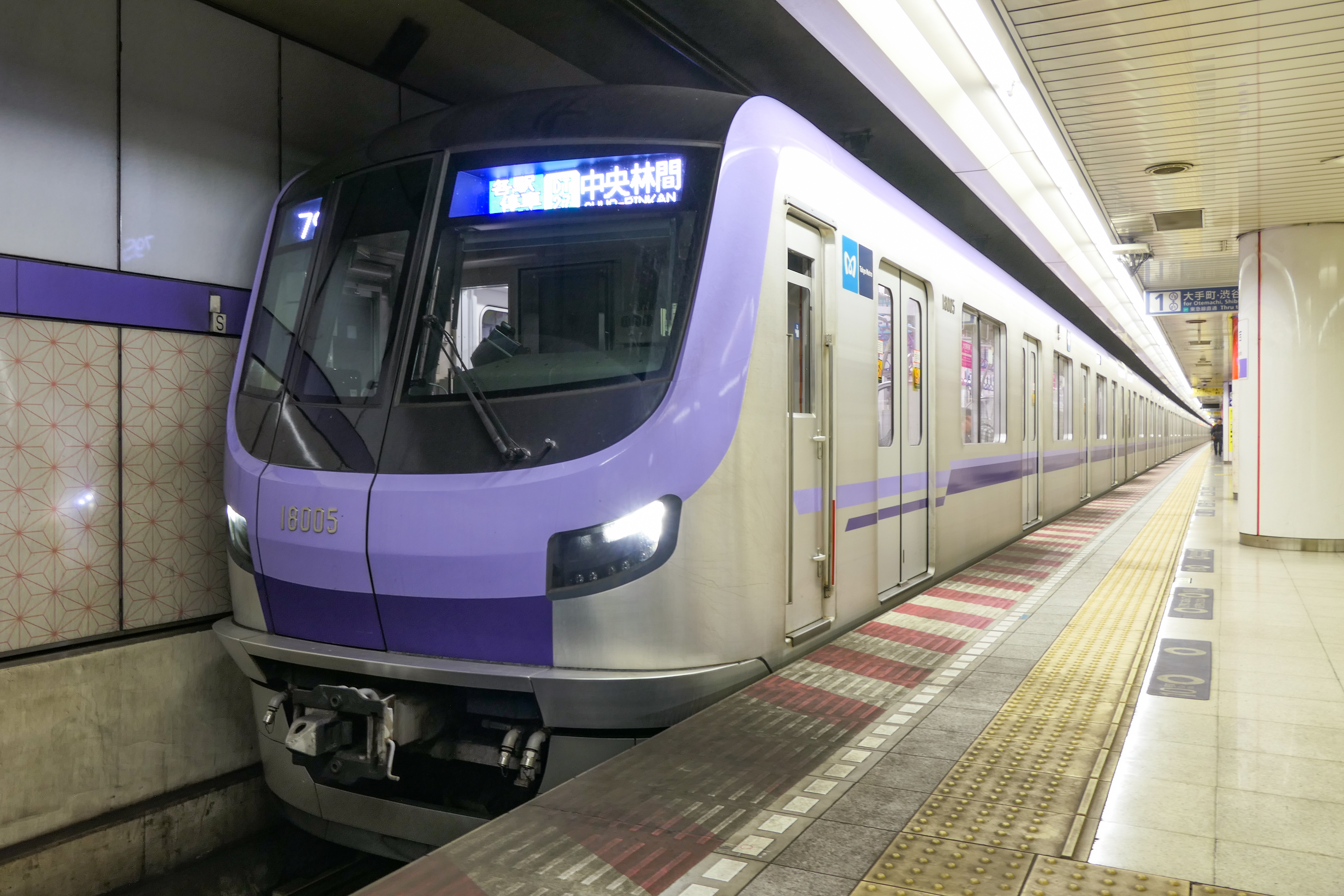
- A Hanzōmon Line 18000 series train

Overview
- Other name: Line 11
- Native name: 半蔵門線
- Status: In service
- Owner: Tokyo Metro Co., Ltd.
- Line number: Z
- Locale: Tokyo
- Termini: Shibuya; Oshiage
- Stations: 14
- Color on map: Purple

Service
- Type: Heavy rail rapid transit
- System: Tokyo subway (Tokyo Metro)
- Operator(s): Tokyo Metro Co., Ltd.
- Depot: Saginuma
- Rolling stock: Tokyo Metro 8000 series Tokyo Metro 08 series Tokyo Metro 18000 series Tokyu 2020 series Tokyu 5000 series Tobu 50000 series Tobu 50050 series
- Daily ridership: 1,006,682 (2017)

History
- Opened: 1 August 1978; 48 years ago
- Last extension: 2003

Technical
- Line length: 16.8 km (10.4 mi)
- Track gauge: 1,067 mm (3 ft 6 in)
- Minimum radius: 160.7 m (527 ft)
- Electrification: Overhead line, 1,500 V DC
- Operating speed: 80 km/h (50 mph)
- Signalling: Cab signalling, Closed block
- Train protection system: New CS-ATC
- Maximum incline: 3.5%
Route map
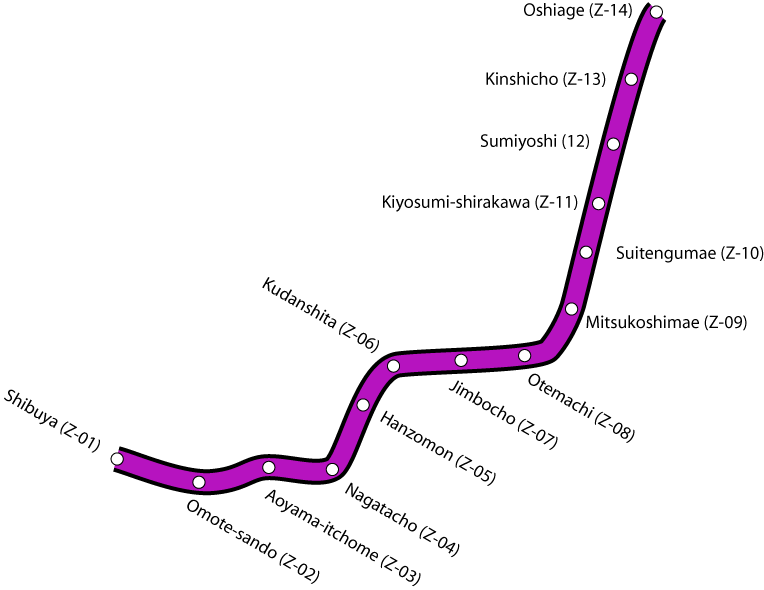

The Hanzōmon Line (半蔵門線, Hanzōmon-sen) is a subway line in Tokyo, Japan, owned and operated by Tokyo Metro.

According to the Tokyo Metropolitan Bureau of Transportation, as of June 2009 the Hanzōmon Line is the sixth most crowded subway line in Tokyo, at its peak running at 173%^{[a]} capacity between Shibuya and Omotesandō stations.

The Hanzōmon Line's color on maps and station guides is purple, and stations carry the letter "Z" followed by a two-digit number.

== Overview ==
The 16.8 km (10.4 mi) line serves the wards of Shibuya, Minato, Chiyoda, Chūō, Kōtō, and Sumida. Despite being shorter in length than nearly all other Tokyo subway lines, the Hanzōmon Line operates some of the longest through services with private railways – namely Tōkyū Corporation and Tobu Railway. The line is connected to Tōkyū Den-en-toshi Line at Shibuya Station to the south, and to the Tobu Skytree Line at Oshiage to the north. Through trains operate between Chūō-Rinkan on the Tōkyū Den-en-toshi Line and Tōbu-Dōbutsu-Kōen on the Tobu Skytree Line, onward to Kuki on the Tobu Isesaki Line and Minami-Kurihashi on the Tobu Nikko Line. Through-service trains between Chūō-Rinkan and Minami-Kurihashi cover a total distance of 98.5 km (61.2 mi) in a single run – nearly six times the length of the Hanzōmon Line alone.

The Hanzōmon Line has direct interchanges with all other Tokyo Metro and Toei lines. It connects with the Tokyo Metro Ginza Line at five stations (the four stations between Shibuya and Nagatachō, as well as at Mitsukoshimae Station.

The line is named after the west gate of the Tokyo Imperial Palace, Hanzōmon (半蔵門), which in turn is named after 16th century samurai Hattori Hanzō, who was important to the founding of the shogunate which built the palace. The route name was selected through a public competition. Approximately 7,600 submissions were received, with "Hanzomon Line" ranking first and "Aoyama Line" second. "Shibuya Line," "Otemachi Line," and "Kudan Line" followed.

The name "Hanzomon Line" dates back to 1903, when a Tokyo tram line of the same name opened near the present-day Hanzomon Station.

== History ==
The Hanzōmon Line was first planned in 1968, along with the Chiyoda Line and Yūrakuchō Line, as a reliever line for the heavily congested Ginza Line. Its initial routing was from Futako-Tamagawa Station on the Tōkyū Den-en-toshi Line to a new station in the Fukagawa district of Kōtō. In 1985, a second draft plan from the Ministry of Transportation moved the Hanzōmon Line's final terminus to Matsudo. During the planning stage, it was known as Line 11.

The opening of the Hanzōmon Line to Oshiage was significantly delayed from the original schedule for several reasons. These included NIMBYs from landowners along the route, as well as the collapse of Japan's bubble economy, which led to declining revenues for the Teito Rapid Transit Authority (TRTA). Between Hanzōmon Station and Kudanshita Station, a "one-tsubo co-ownership movement" emerged. Residents organized the movement in protest over what they argued was inadequate public consultation regarding subway construction and concerns about environmental deterioration. Under this movement, many individuals jointly purchased tiny shares of land to complicate land acquisition for the project.

As a result, the TRTA applied for compulsory land expropriation under Japan's Land Expropriation Act. Even so, the land acquisition process took approximately ten years to complete. Construction began in 1972 and the majority of the line was expected to open in 1975. However, the TRTA did not have enough funds to build the line, which delayed its construction. On August 1, 1978, the first section of the Hanzōmon Line finally opened from Shibuya to Aoyama-itchōme, including through services with the Den-en-toshi Line. It was then extended to Nagatachō Station in September 1979. The line was initially operated mainly using Tokyu rolling stock, as the first TRTA 8000 series train did not enter service until 1981.

Hanzōmon Station opened in December 1982, and the full extension around the Imperial Palace, terminating at Mitsukoshi-mae, was not completed until January 1989. The line was then extended to Suitengu-mae in November 1990 and finally Oshiage in March 2003, the latter also enabling through service with the Tobu Skytree Line.

The line, station facilities, rolling stock, and related assets were inherited by Tokyo Metro after the privatization of the Teito Rapid Transit Authority (TRTA) in 2004.

The Ministry of Transportation recommended in 2000 that the line be extended to its intended terminus in Matsudo by 2015. However, Tokyo Metro stated in its initial public offering that its construction operations would cease once the Fukutoshin Line is completed, which cast some doubt as to whether the Matsudo extension will actually be built.

== Stations ==
List of Hanzomon Line and through service stations

- All stations are located in Tokyo.
- All services stop at every station.

No.	Station	Japanese	Distance (km)		Transfers	Location
No.	Station	Japanese	Between stations	From Shibuya	Transfers	Location
↑ Through-services to/from Saginuma, Nagatsuta, Chūō-Rinkan via Den-en-toshi Line ↑
Z-01	Shibuya	渋谷 (Note: Shibuya is shared by both Tokyu Corporation and Tokyo Metro; Tokyu Corporation manages the station.)	-	0.0	Den-en-toshi Line (DT01; through service); Tōyoko Line (TY01); Fukutoshin Line (F-16); Ginza Line (G-01); Yamanote Line (JY20); Saikyō Line (JA10); Shōnan–Shinjuku Line (JS19); Inokashira Line (IN01)	Shibuya
Z-02	Omotesandō	表参道	1.3	1.3	Chiyoda Line (C-04); Ginza Line (G-02) (Note: Due to the distance between the Ginza and Hanzōmon/Den-en-toshi lines at Shibuya, transfers between the two lines are announced at Omote-sando.)	Minato
Z-03	Aoyama-itchōme	青山一丁目	1.4	2.7	Ginza Line (G-04); Ōedo Line (E-24)	Minato
Z-04	Nagatachō	永田町	1.4	4.1	Yūrakuchō Line (Y-16); Namboku Line (N-07); Marunouchi Line (Akasaka-mitsuke: M-13); Ginza Line (Akasaka-mitsuke: G-05)	Chiyoda
Z-05	Hanzōmon	半蔵門	1.0	5.1		Chiyoda
Z-06	Kudanshita	九段下	1.6	6.7	Tōzai Line (T-07); Shinjuku Line (S-05)	Chiyoda
Z-07	Jimbōchō	神保町	0.4	7.1	Mita Line (I-10); Shinjuku Line (S-06)	Chiyoda
Z-08	Ōtemachi	大手町	1.7	8.8	Marunouchi Line (M-18); Chiyoda Line (C-11); Tōzai Line (T-09); Mita Line (I-09); Tokyo Station: Tōkaidō Shinkansen Tōhoku Shinkansen (Hokkaido, Akita, Yamagata) Jōetsu Shinkansen Hokuriku Shinkansen Yamanote Line (JY01) Keihin–Tōhoku Line (JK26) Chūō Line (JC01) Tōkaidō Line (JT01) Ueno-Tokyo Line (JU01) Yokosuka Line/Sōbu Line (JO19) Keiyō Line (JE01)	Chiyoda
Z-09	Mitsukoshimae	三越前	0.7	9.5	Ginza Line (G-12); Sōbu Line (Shin-Nihombashi: JO20)	Chūō
Z-10	Suitengūmae	水天宮前	1.3	10.8	Hibiya Line (Ningyocho: H-14); Asakusa Line (Ningyocho: A-14)	Chūō
Z-11	Kiyosumi-shirakawa	清澄白河	1.7	12.5	Ōedo Line (E-14)	Kōtō
Z-12	Sumiyoshi	住吉	1.9	14.4	Shinjuku Line (S-13)	Kōtō
Z-13	Kinshicho	錦糸町	1.0	15.4	Sōbu Line (JO22); Chūō–Sōbu Line (JB22)	Sumida
Z-14	Oshiage	押上 (Note: Oshiage is shared by both Tobu Railway and Tokyo Metro; Tokyo Metro manages the station.)	1.4	16.8	Tobu Skytree Line (TS03; though service); Asakusa Line (A-20); Oshiage Line (KS45)	Sumida
↓ Through-services to/from: ↓: Kita-Koshigaya, Tōbu-Dōbutsu-Kōen via Tobu Skytree Line; Kuki via Isesaki Line; Minami-Kurihashi via Nikkō Line

== Rolling stock ==
=== Current ===
All Hanzōmon Line rolling stock owned by Tokyo Metro are stored and maintained at Saginuma Depot (ja:鷺沼車両基地), located near Saginuma Station on the Tokyu Den-en-toshi Line.

- Tokyo Metro 18000 series
- Tokyo Metro 08 series
- Tokyo Metro 8000 series
- Tokyu 2020 series
- Tokyu 5000 series
- Tobu 50000 series
- Tobu 50050 series
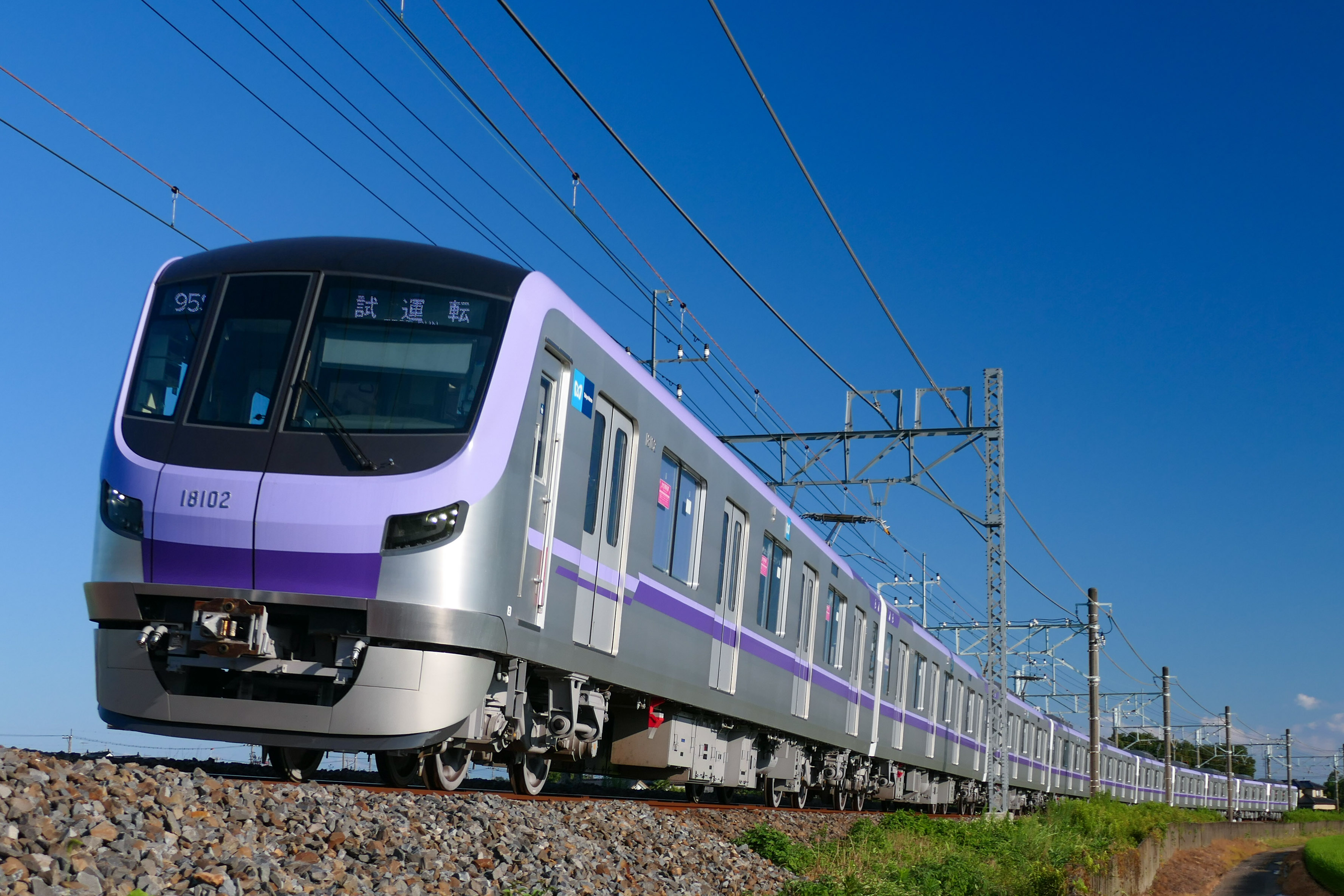
Tokyo Metro 18000 series

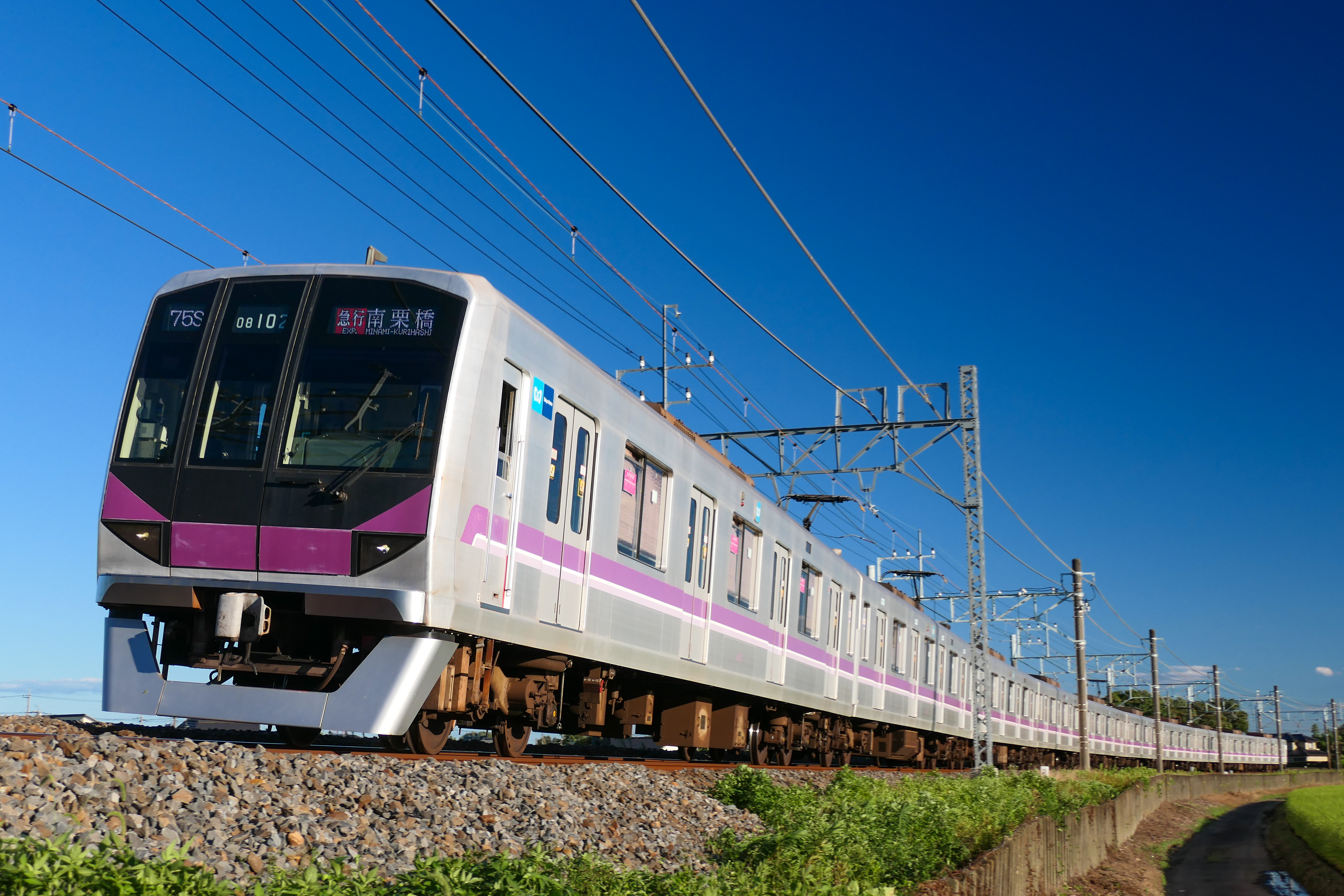
Tokyo Metro 08 series

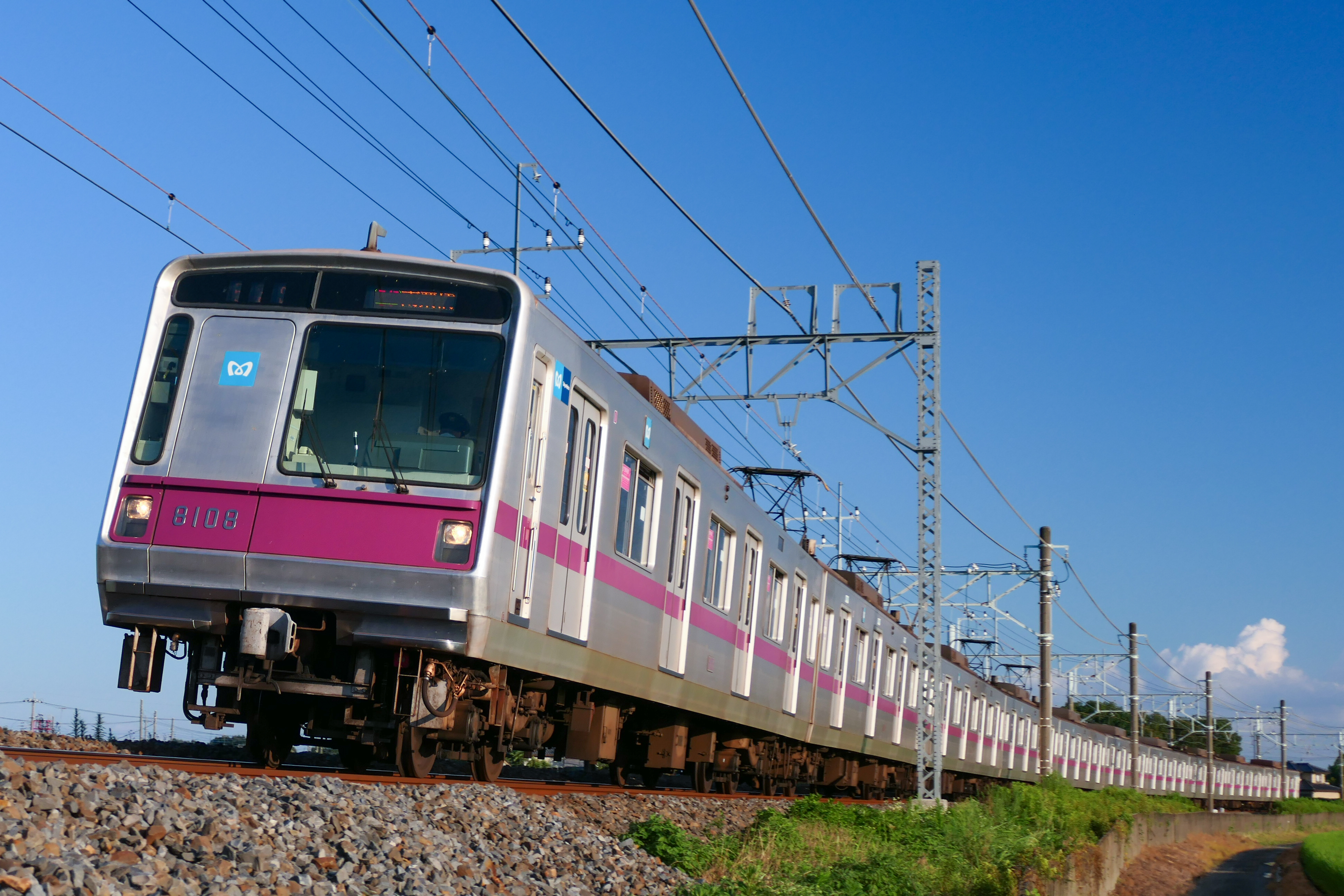
Tokyo Metro 8000 series

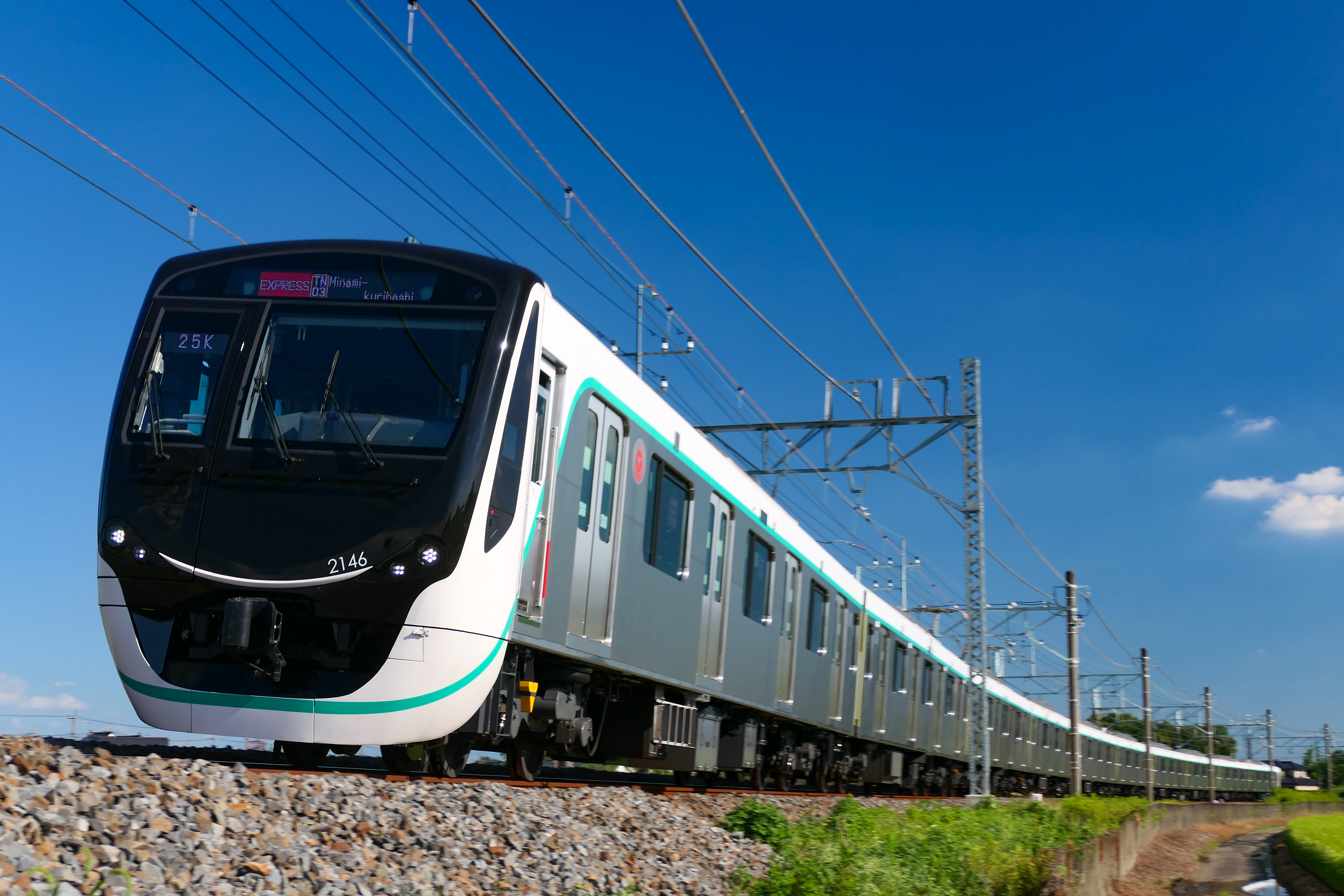
Tokyu 2020 series

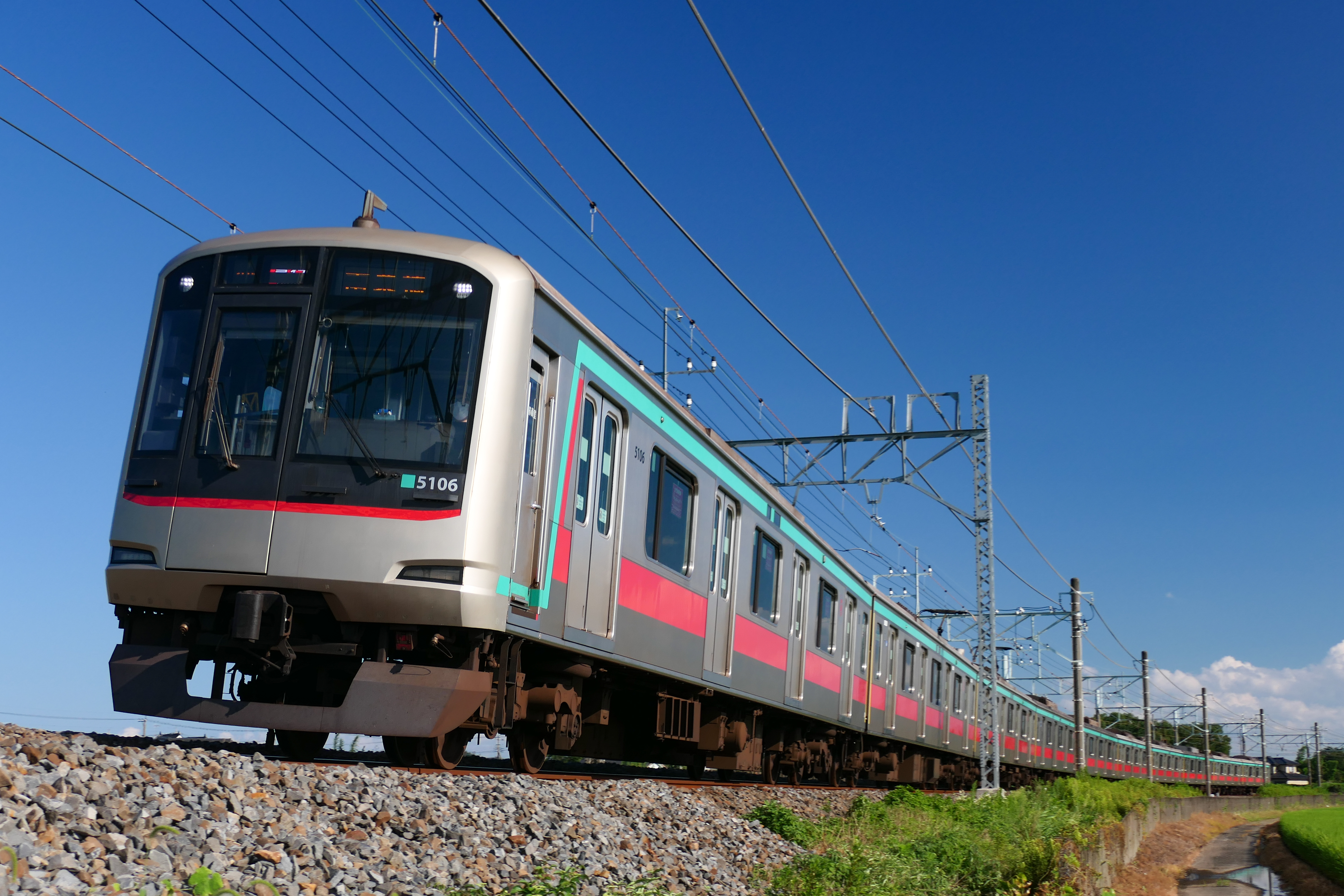
Tokyu 5000 series

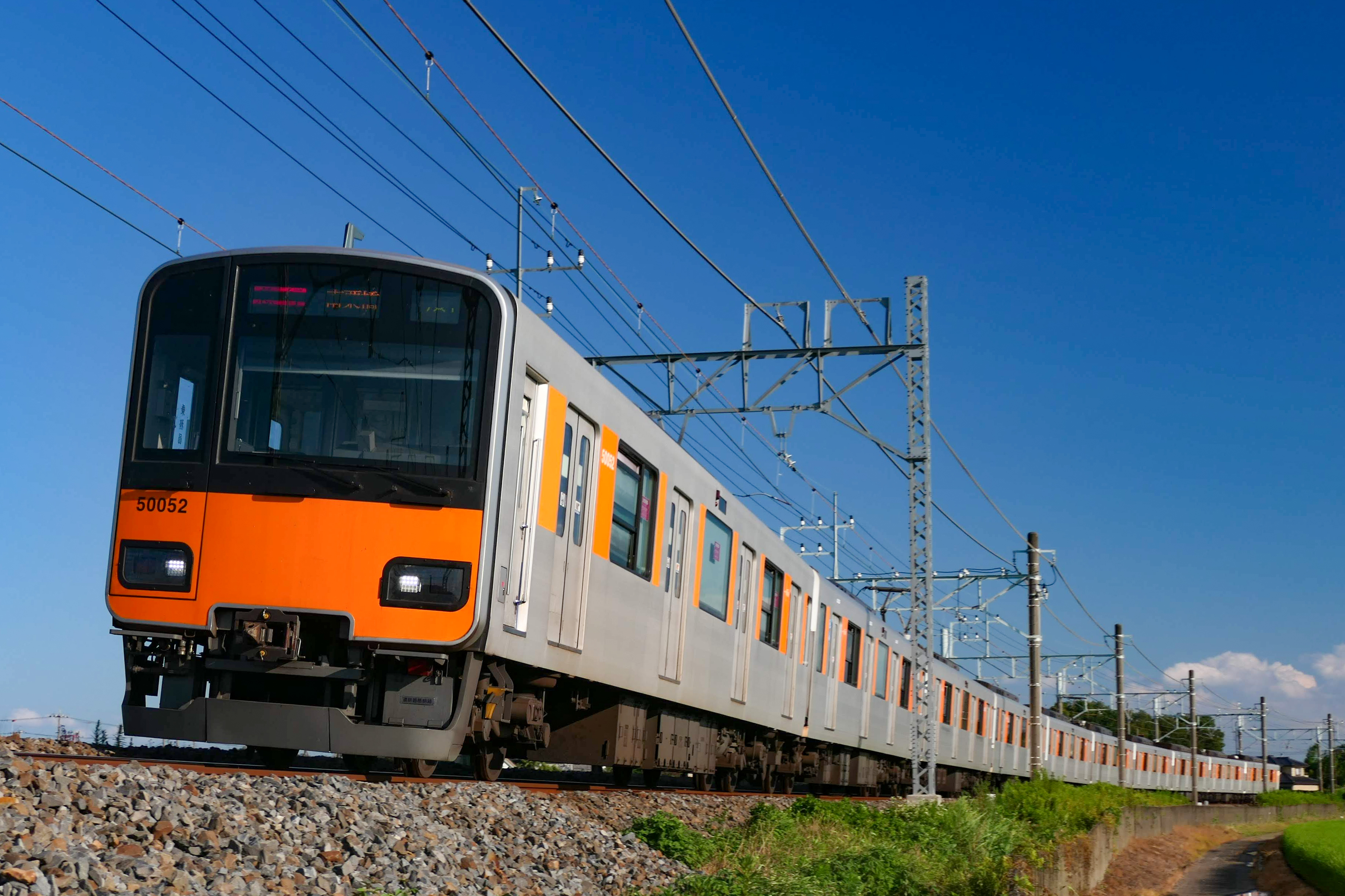
Tobu 50050 series

=== Former ===
- Tobu 30000 series
- Tokyu 2000 series
- Tokyu 8500 series
- Tokyu 8590 series
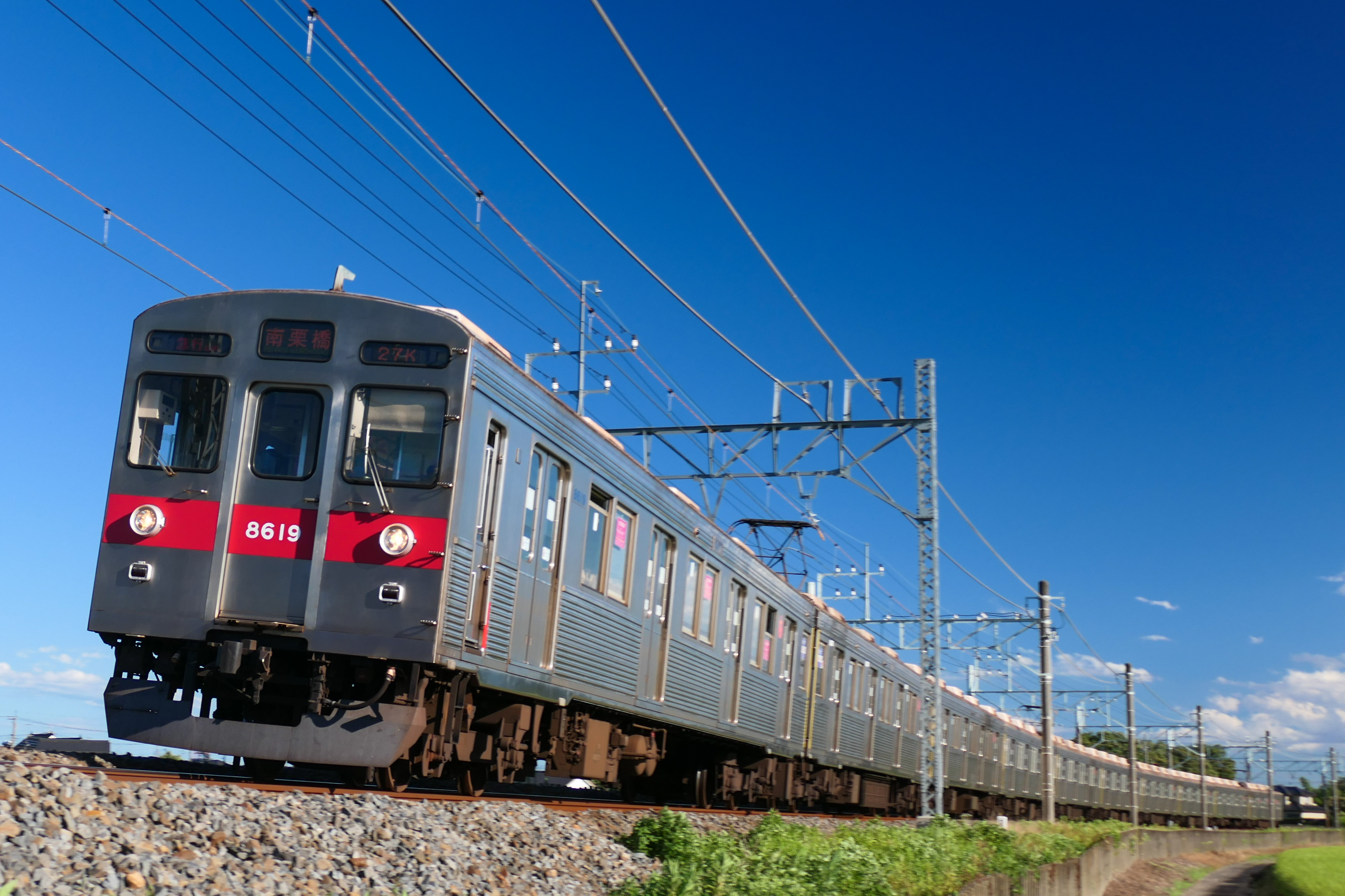
Tokyu 8500 series

== Notes ==
a. Crowding levels defined by the Ministry of Land, Infrastructure, Transport and Tourism:

100% — Commuters have enough personal space and are able to take a seat or stand while holding onto the straps or hand rails.
150% — Commuters have enough personal space to read a newspaper.
180% — Commuters must fold newspapers to read.
200% — Commuters are pressed against each other in each compartment but can still read small magazines.
250% — Commuters are pressed against each other, unable to move.

== Bibliography ==
=== Works cited ===
- Shaw, Dennis; Morokawa, Hisashi (1992). Tokyo Subways. Osaka, Japan: Hoikusha Publishing Co., Ltd. ISBN 4-586-54045-1.
