= Tokyo Metro 8000 series =

Electric multiple unit train type operated in Japan

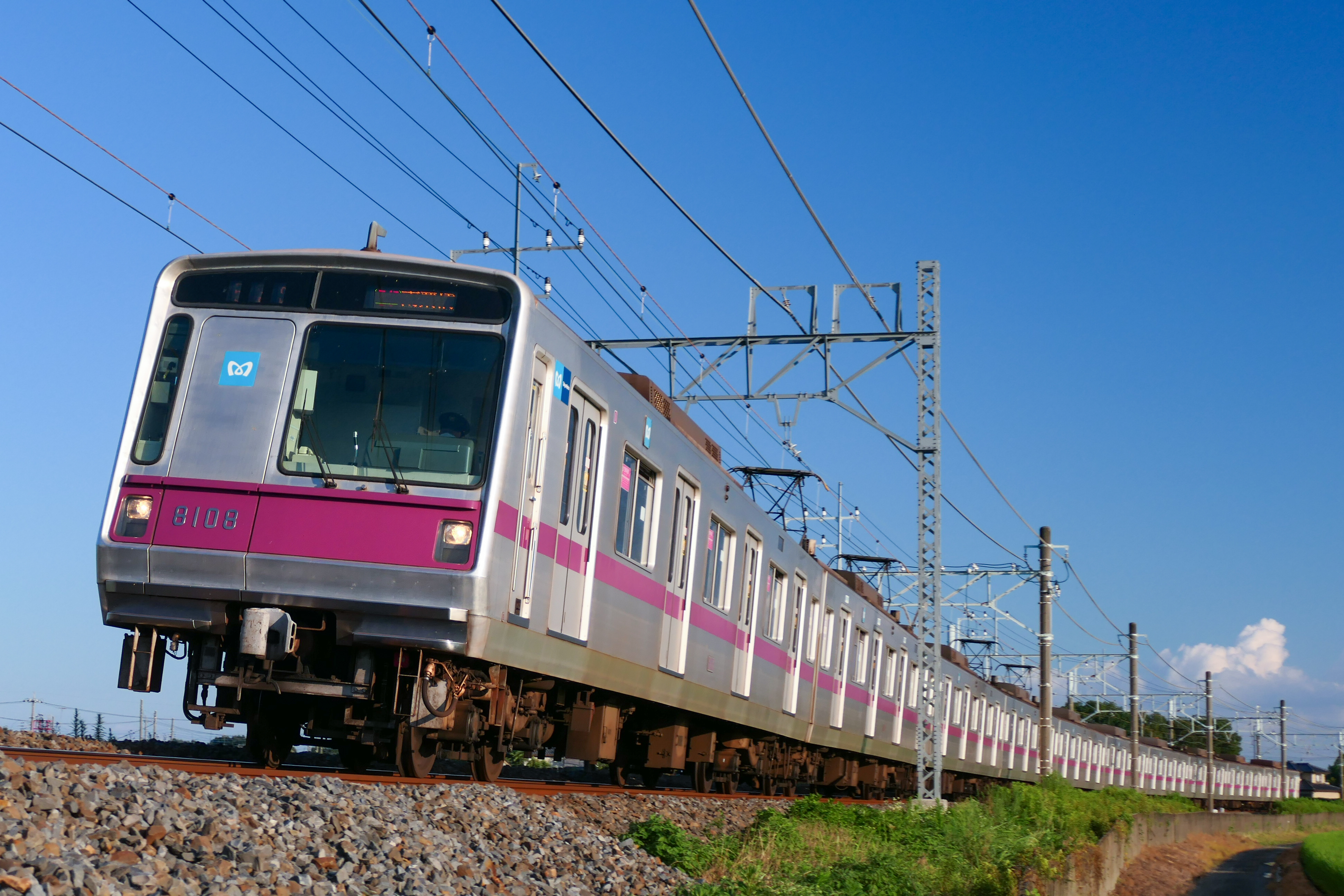
- Set 8108 in July 2021
- Manufacturers: Kawasaki Heavy Industries, Kinki Sharyo, Nippon Sharyo, Tokyu Car Corporation
- Constructed: 1980–1994
- Entered service: 1 April 1981
- Refurbished: 2004–2015
- Scrapped: 2021–
- Number built: 190 vehicles (19 sets)
- Number in service: 20 vehicles (2 sets) (as of December 2025)
- Number scrapped: 170 vehicles (17 sets)
- Successor: Tokyo Metro 18000 series
- Formation: 10 cars per trainset
- Capacity: 136 (48 seating) (end cars), 144/150 (51/54 seating) (intermediate cars)
- Operators: Tokyo Metro, previously TRTA
- Depot: Saginuma
- Lines served: Tokyo Metro Hanzomon Line; Tokyu Den-en-toshi Line; Tobu Skytree Line; Tobu Nikkō Line; Tobu Isesaki Line

Specifications
- Car body construction: Aluminium
- Car length: 20,000 mm (65 ft 7 in)
- Width: 2,830 mm (9 ft 3 in)
- Height: 4,135 mm (13 ft 6.8 in)
- Doors: 4 per side
- Maximum speed: 100 km/h (62 mph)
- Weight: 318.1t (original), 294.8t (refurbished)
- Traction system: Chopper control, later changed to IGBT-VVVF
- Power output: 160 kW (original), 165 kW (refurbished)
- Transmission: Westinghouse Natal (WN) drive; Gear ratio: 5.73 : 1
- Acceleration: 3.3 km/(h⋅s) (2.1 mph/s)
- Deceleration: 3.5 km/(h⋅s) (2.2 mph/s)(service); 4.5 km/(h⋅s) (2.8 mph/s) (emergency)
- Electric system: 1,500 V DC overhead
- Bogies: SS-101, SS-035A
- Braking system: Electronically controlled pneumatic brakes with regenerative braking
- Safety systems: Tokyo Metro CS-ATC, Tokyu CS-ATC, Tobu ATS
- Coupling system: Janney coupler
- Track gauge: 1,067 mm (3 ft 6 in)

The Tokyo Metro 8000 series (東京メトロ8000系, Tōkyō Metoro 8000-kei) is an electric multiple unit (EMU) train type operated by Tokyo subway operator Tokyo Metro on the Tokyo Metro Hanzomon Line in Tokyo, Japan, since 1981.

A total of 190 cars (19 ten-car sets) were built between 1980 and 1994 by Kawasaki Heavy Industries, Kinki Sharyo, Nippon Sharyo, and Tokyu Car Corporation.

== Technical details ==
The train shares some design similarities with the earlier Tokyo Metro 6000 series on the Chiyoda Line and the Tokyo Metro 7000 series on the Fukutoshin Line, mainly the asymmetrical front and bodyshell with some cosmetic changes.

=== Original sets ===
- Motor output: 160 kW (215 hp)
- MT ratio: 6M4T
- Total train power output: 3,840 kW (5,150 hp)
- Control system: Chopper control

=== Refurbished (B-refurbishment) sets ===
- Motor output: 165 kW (221 hp)
- MT ratio: 5M5T
- Total train power output: 3,300 kW (4,425 hp)
- Control system: IGBT-VVVF control

== Formations ==
As of 2016, all of the 19 ten-car sets are refurbished formed as shown below, with car 1 at the Oshiage (northern) end.

=== Original unrefurbished sets ===
Car No.	1	2	3	4	5	6	7	8	9	10
Designation	CT1	M1	M2'	M1	Mc2	Tc1	T2'	M1	M2	CT2
Numbering	8100	8200	8300	8400	8500	8600	8700	8800	8900	8000

Cars 2, 4, and 8 each have two lozenge-type pantographs.

=== Refurbished sets ===
Car No.	1	2	3	4	5	6	7	8	9	10
Designation	CT1	M1	T3	M1	Mc2	Tc1	T2'	M1	M2	CT2
Numbering	8100	8200	8300	8400	8500	8600	8700	8800	8900	8000

Cars 2, 4, and 8 each have two lozenge-type pantographs.

== Interior ==
Cars 3 and 9 in the refurbished sets have a wheelchair space.

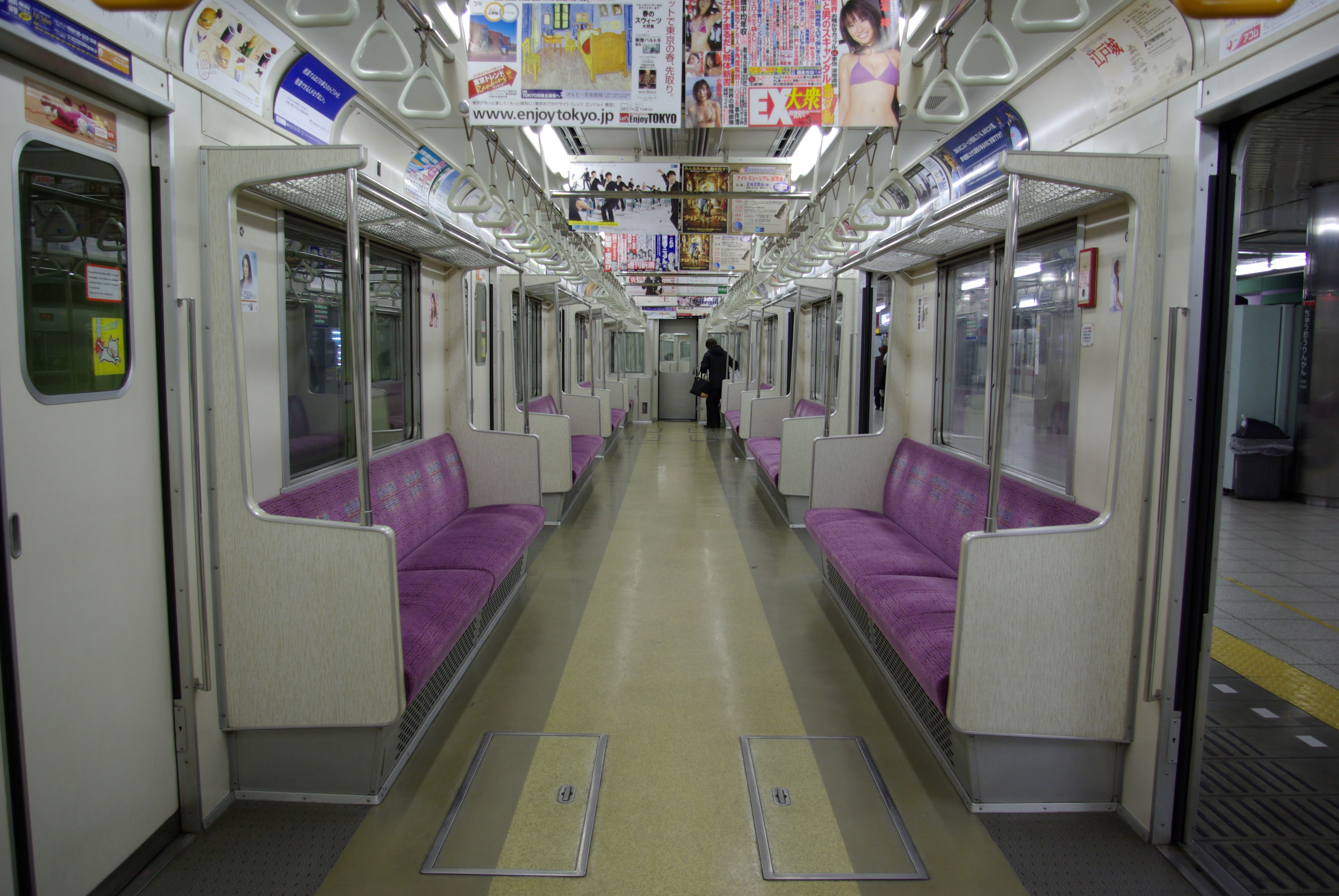
Original style interior in February 2007

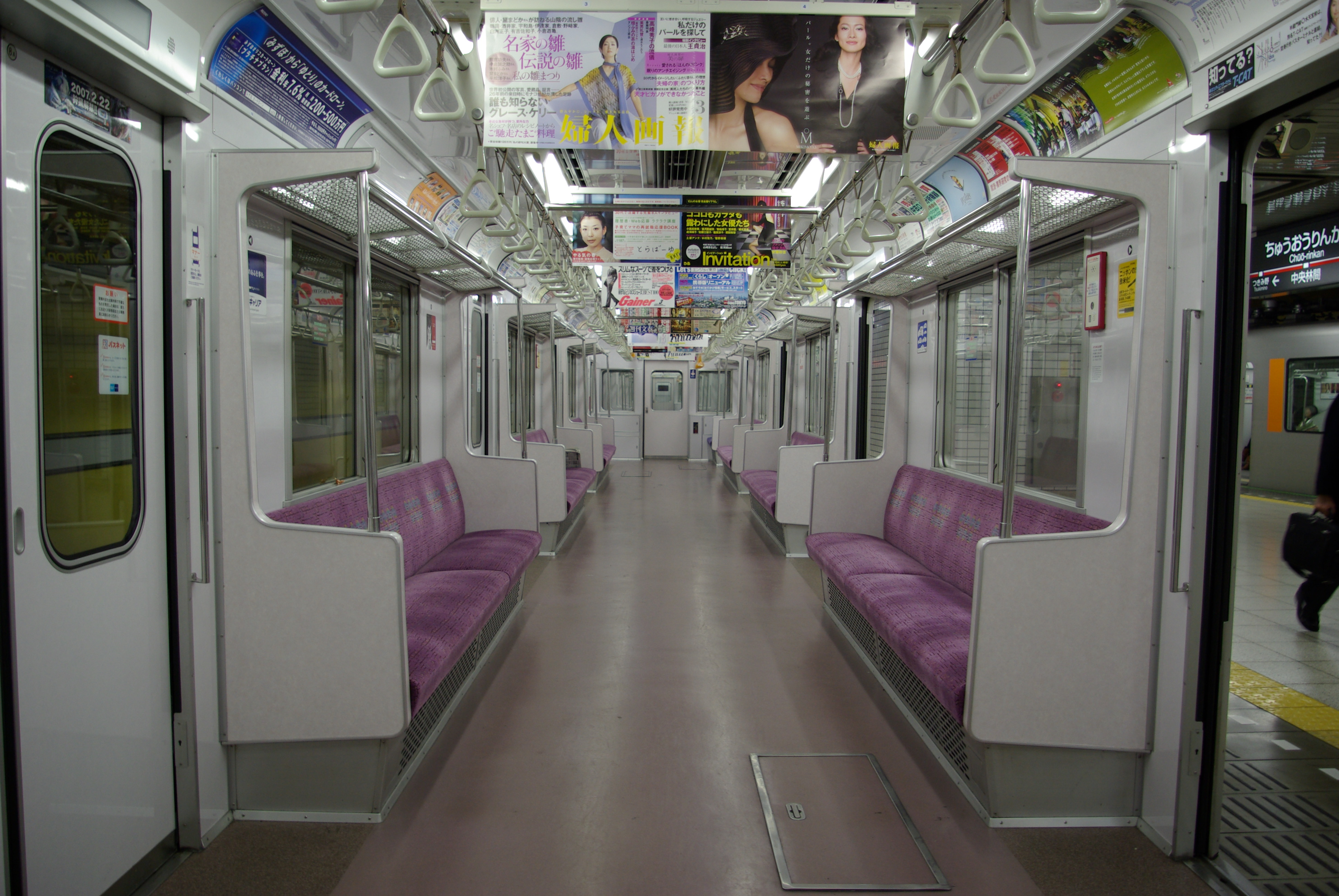
Interior of a refurbished set in February 2007

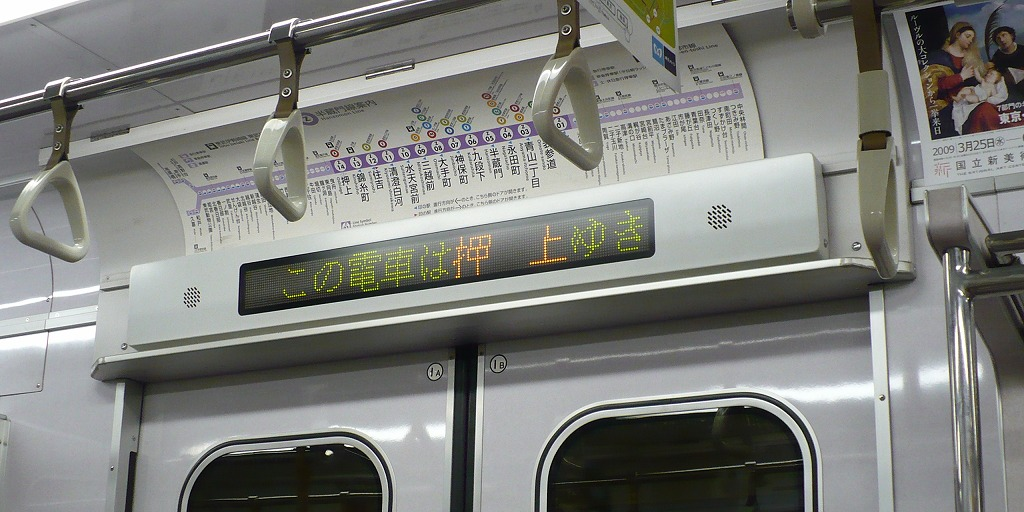
LED passenger information display

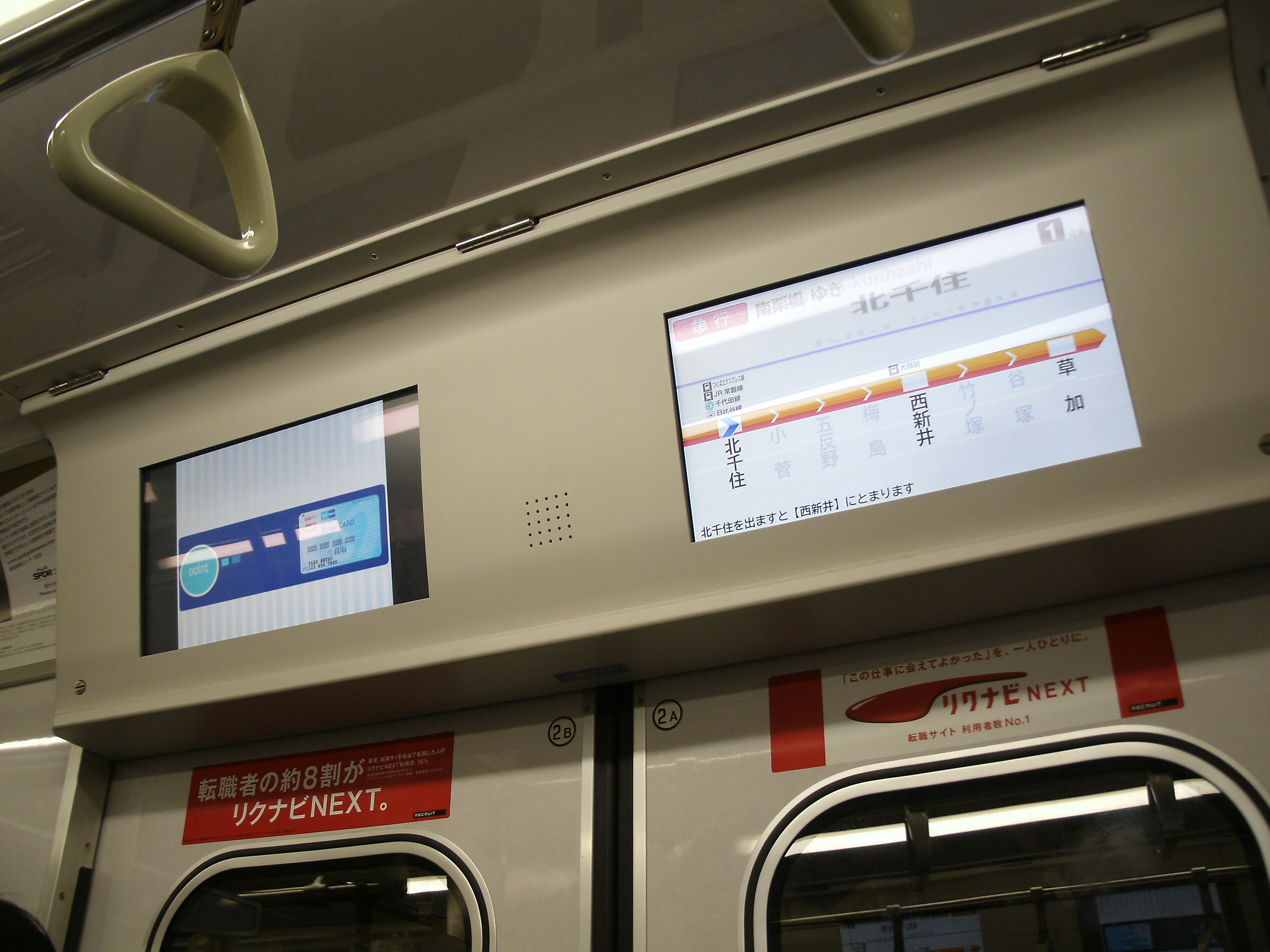
LCD passenger information display (refurbished set) in November 2010

== Underside Equipment ==
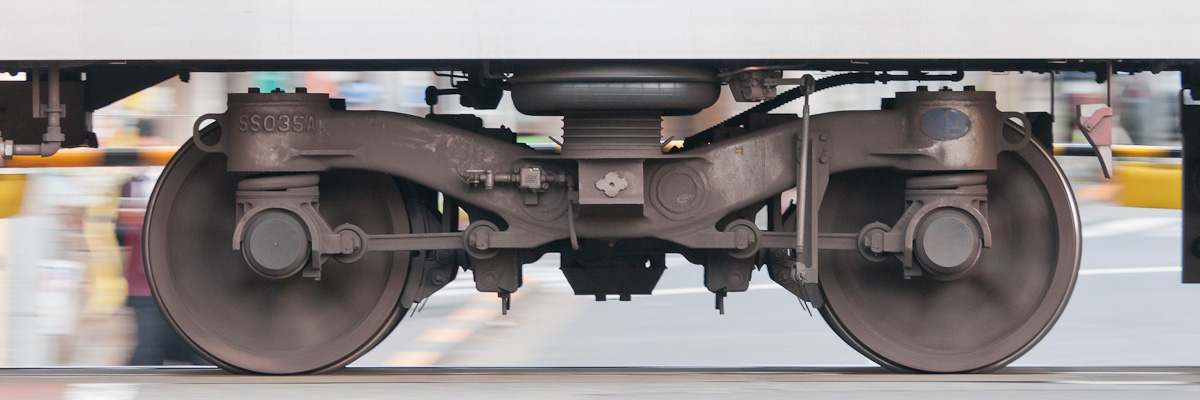
FS035A bogie as used on the 8000 series

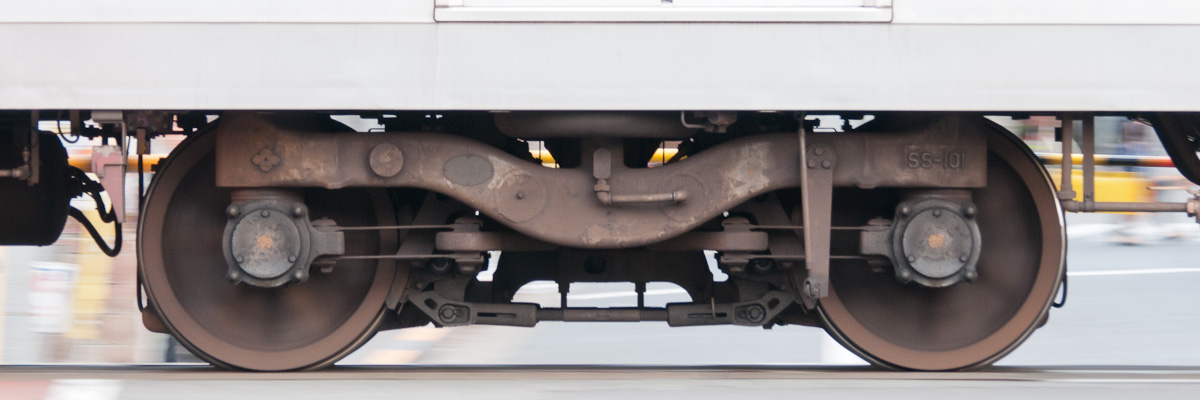
SS101 bogie as used on the 8000 series

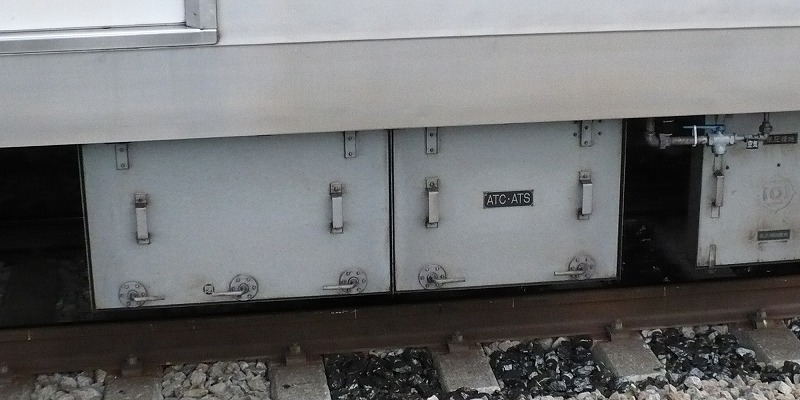
ATC equipment as used on the 8000 series

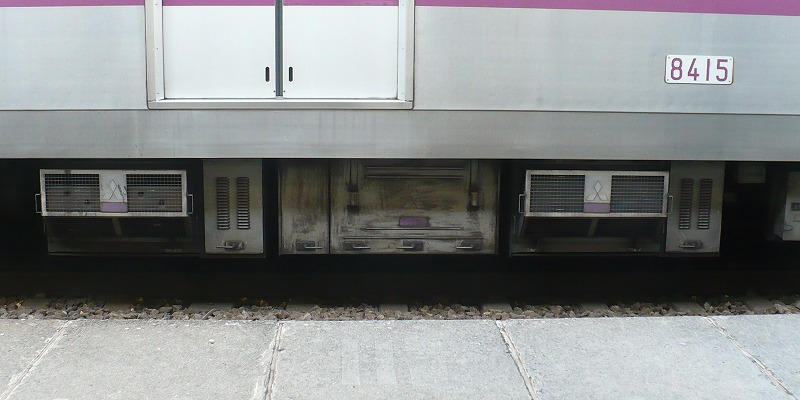
Chopper control device on the 8000 series

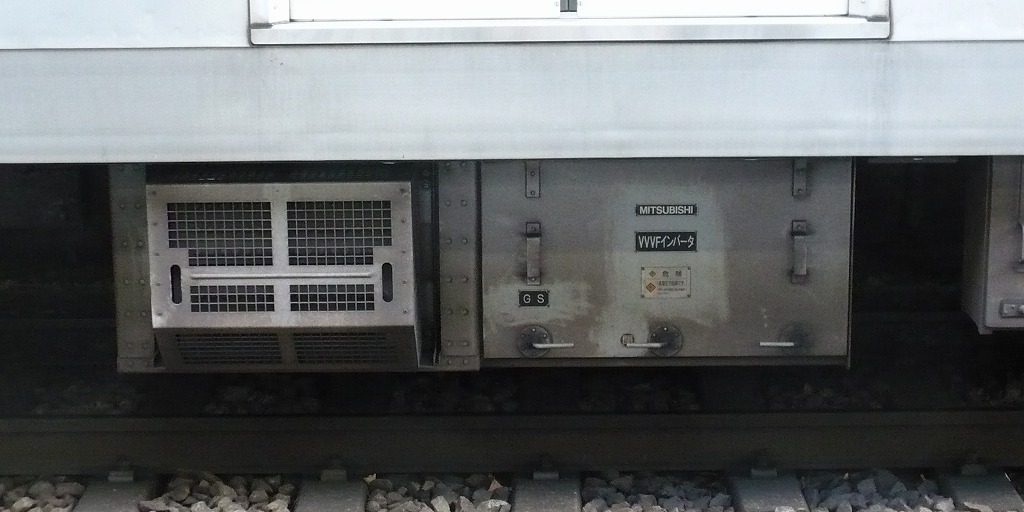
VVVF inverter equipment as used on refurbished units

== History ==
The first 8000 series trains were introduced on 1 April 1981, initially operating as 6- and 8-car sets. The Hanzomon Line was originally operated using Tokyu 8500 series 6-car sets leased from Tokyu Corporation. By 1982, all 8000 series sets operated as 8-car formations, and between 1987 and 1994, the fleet was lengthened again to 10 cars.

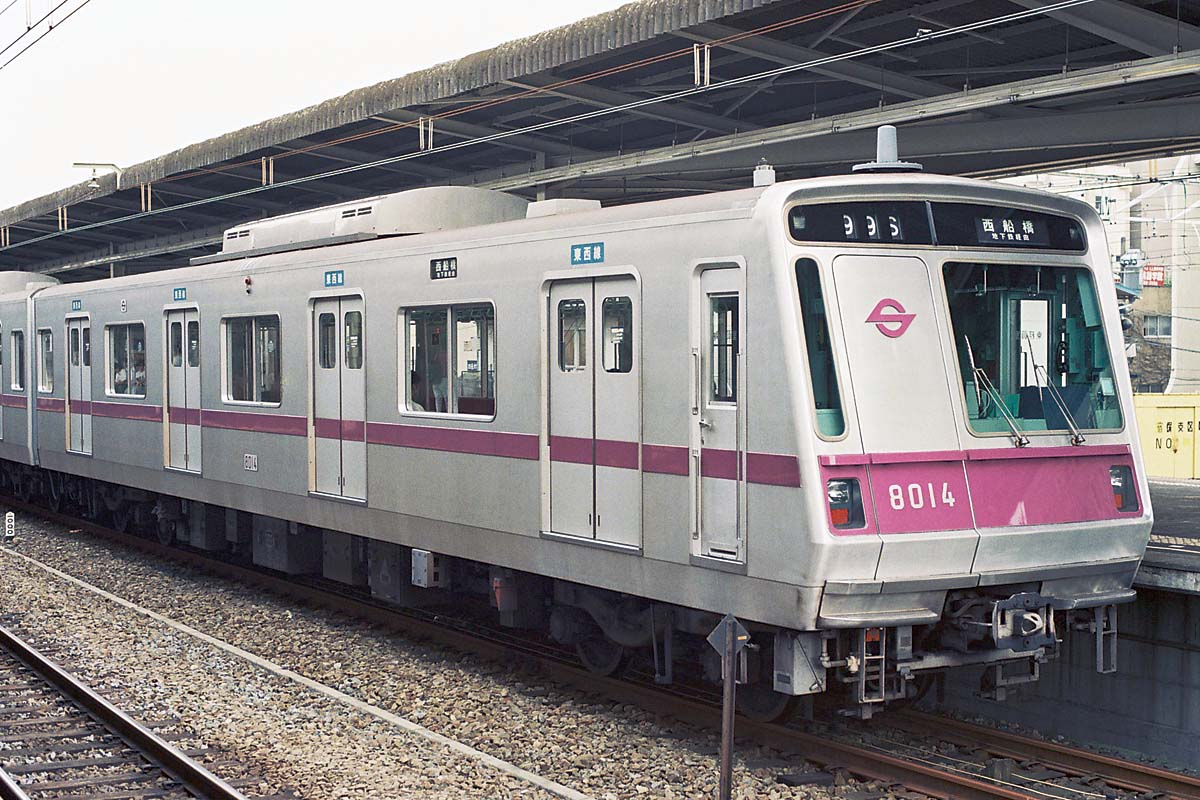
8000 series set on the Tozai Line in 1988

Due to a surge in ridership on the Tozai Line, the Teito Rapid Transit Authority (TRTA) introduced three 10-car 8000 series sets on that line in 1987. TRTA also considered introducing more 5000 series trains, but its base design was over two decades old, and development of a new train type was still underway. These 8000 series sets were transferred to Hanzomon Line services within a year.

From 2004, a programme of refurbishment commenced, with some sets receiving VVVF control and three-phase motors. In February 2016, set 8114 received full-colour LED destination indicators.

== Withdrawal ==
The 8000 series trains began to be replaced by new 18000 series trains from 7 August 2021. The first set to be withdrawn, set 8107, was removed for scrapping in August 2021.

Two 8000 series sets remain in service as of December 2025.
