= Eastern Capital =

Chinese name
- Traditional Chinese: 東京
- Simplified Chinese: 东京
Transcriptions
Standard Mandarin
- Hanyu Pinyin: Dōngjīng

Vietnamese name
- Vietnamese: Đông Kinh
- Hán-Nôm: 東京

Korean name
- Hangul: 동경
- Hanja: 東京
Transcriptions
- Revised Romanization: Donggyeong

Japanese name
- Kanji: 東京
- Hiragana: とうきょう
Transcriptions
- Revised Hepburn: Tōkyō

Eastern Capital may refer to:

- Tokyo
- Tonkin
- The former name of Luoyang
- The former name of Kaifeng
- The former name of Hanoi

== See also ==
- 東京 (disambiguation), Eastern Capital in Chinese
- Tokyo (disambiguation)
- Tokio (disambiguation)
- Tonkin (disambiguation)
- Dongjing (disambiguation)
