= 東京 (disambiguation) =

東京 (Tokyo) is the capital of Japan.

東京 may also refer to:

- Đông Kinh (東京), a former name of Hanoi, Vietnam
- Tonkin, a part of Vietnam
  - Tonkin (disambiguation)
- Dongjing (disambiguation) (東京) in Chinese
  - Luoyang
  - Kaifeng

== See also ==
- Tokyo (disambiguation)
- Eastern Capital (disambiguation)
