= Tokyo Nights =

Tokyo Nights may refer to:

- "Tokyo Nights", song by the Bee Gees from the album One
- "Tokyo Nights", song by Digital Farm Animals and Dragonette
- "Tokyo Nights", song by Krokus from the album Metal Rendez-vous

== See also ==
- Tokyo (disambiguation)
