= Tokyu (disambiguation) =

Tokyu may refer to:

- Tokyu Group, a group of companies centered on Tokyu Corporation
  - Tokyu Corporation, a Japanese railway company, the largest member and parent company of the group
  - Tokyu Car Corporation, a former Japanese railway vehicle manufacturer, now the Japan Transport Engineering Company
  - Tokyu Hands Creative Life Store, a member of the Tokyu Group
  - Tokyu Department Store, a department store chain based in Japan

== See also ==
- Tokyo (disambiguation)
