= Tokio =

Tokio may refer to:

- Tokyo (東京, Tōkyō), the capital of Japan, used primarily in non-English-speaking countries

Tokio (トキオ) may also refer to:

== Music ==
- Tokio (band), a Japanese pop/rock band
  - Tokio (album), their debut album
- Tokio Hotel, a German rock band
- Tokio, a Japanese singer Kenji Sawada's album and song

== Places ==
- Tokio, North Dakota, a community in the United States
- Tokio, Texas, a community in the United States
- Tokio, Washington, a ghost town

== Companies and other organizations ==
- Tokio Marine Nichido, a Japanese insurance company
- Tokio Millennium Re Ltd., a reinsurance company

== Other uses ==
- Tokio (given name), a masculine Japanese given name
- 498 Tokio, a minor planet
- Tokio, a 1986 video game originally released as Scramble Formation
- City of Tokio, an iron steamship built in 1874 in the USA
- Tokio (yacht)
- Tokio Express, a container ship that caused the great Lego spill of 1997
- Tokio (software), asynchronous input/output software library for the Rust programming language

== See also ==
- Tokyo (disambiguation)
