= Dongjin =

Dongjin (Chinese: 东津; lit. 'east ford') may refer to the following locations in China:

- Dongjin, Guangxi, town in Gangnan District, Guigang
- Dongjin, Heilongjiang, town in Beilin District, Suihua
- Dongjin, Hubei, town in Xiangzhou District, Xiangyang, Hubei
- Dongjin Bridge, Ganzhou, Jiangxi

== See also ==
- Eastern Jin dynasty, or Dong Jin
- Dongjing (disambiguation)
- Dong Jin, 8th century general of the Chinese Tang Dynasty
