= Tonkin (surname) =

Tonkin is the surname of the following notable people:

- Albert Tonkin (1886–1969), Australian soldier
- Anthony Tonkin (born 1980), English footballer
- Athur Tonkin (disambiguation) – multiple people
- Bill Tonkin, 20th century Australian rugby league footballer
- Boyd Tonkin, English writer, journalist and literary critic
- Christine Tonkin (born 1956), Australian politician
- David Tonkin (1929–2000), Premier of South Australia
- Doc Tonkin (1881–1959), American physician and professional baseball player
- Ella Tonkin (born 2002), Australian soccer player
- Eric Tonkin (1894–1958), Australian rules footballer
- Evie Tonkin (born 1997), English rugby player
- Felicity Tonkin (born 1985), daughter of Mark Phillips and Heather Tonkin
- Humphrey Tonkin (born 1939), American-British professor and Esperantist
- James Tonkin (1835–1906), English-born Australian politician
- John Tonkin (disambiguation) – multiple people
- Luke Tonkin, Australian actor
- Mary Tonkin, Australian artist
- Michael Tonkin (born 1989), American professional baseball player
- Phoebe Tonkin (born 1989), Australian actress
- Ralph Tonkin, New Zealand engineer and founder of the company Tonkin + Taylor
- Shane Tonkin (born 1971), Australian former baseball pitcher
- Shanea Tonkin (born 1997), Australian field hockey player
- Shirley Tonkin (1921–2016), New Zealand paediatrican
- Thomas Tonkin (1678–1742), Cornish landowner and historian
