= Japan Transport Engineering Company =

Japanese heavy rail car manufacturing company

- Corporate wordmark

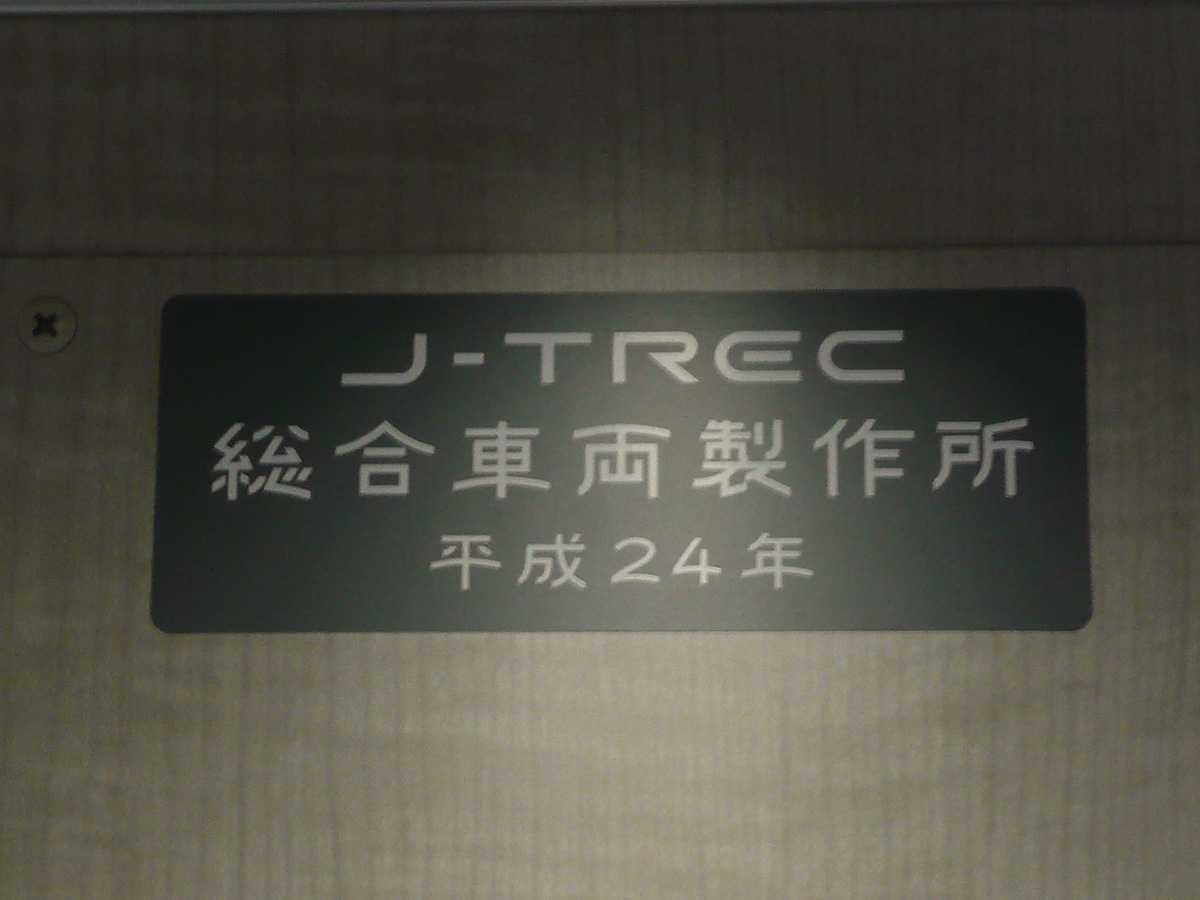
- J-TREC manufacturer's tag
- Trade name: J-TREC
- Native name: 株式会社総合車両製作所
- Romanized name: Kabushiki gaisha Sōgō Sharyō Seisaku-sho
- Formerly: New Tokyu Car Corporation (2011–2012)
- Type: Subsidiary (Kabushiki gaisha)
- Predecessor: Tokyu Car Manufacturing Company, Ltd.; Tokyu Car Corporation (~2012)
- Founded: 9 November 2011; 14 years ago
- Headquarters: Yokohama, Japan
- Products: Rolling stock; Trams
- Number of employees: 1,154 (2015)
- Parent: East Japan Railway Company
- Website: Official site

Japan Transport Engineering Company (J-TREC) (株式会社総合車両製作所, Kabushiki gaisha Sōgō Sharyō Seisakusho; lit. "Stock Company General Rolling Stock Plant") is a manufacturer of heavy rail cars in Japan, formerly known as Tokyu Car Corporation (東急車輛製造株式会社, Tōkyū Sharyō-seizō kabushiki gaisha). The company is based in Kanazawa-ku, Yokohama, and a member of East Japan Railway Company (JR East) group. J-TREC manufactures rail vehicles not only for JR East and Tokyu Corporation but for other Japanese operators, including various Japan Railways Group companies and international operators as well.

Tokyu Car Corporation, the predecessor of J-TREC, was founded on 23 August 1948. Tokyu Car was a licensee of early-generation (early-1960s) stainless-steel commuter EMU train body and related bogie technology from the Budd Company of the United States. Since then, Tokyu Car has specialised in stainless-steel body car technology.

On 27 October 2011, Tokyu Car Corporation announced that its rolling stock manufacturing division would be acquired by East Japan Railway Company (JR East), and the company cease operations with effect from 1 April 2012. It is to be subsequently split into two companies, Tokyu Car Engineering and Keihin Steel Works. Both companies will be subsidiaries of JR East. The remaining parts and machinery manufacturing division was subsequently sold to ShinMaywa Industries.

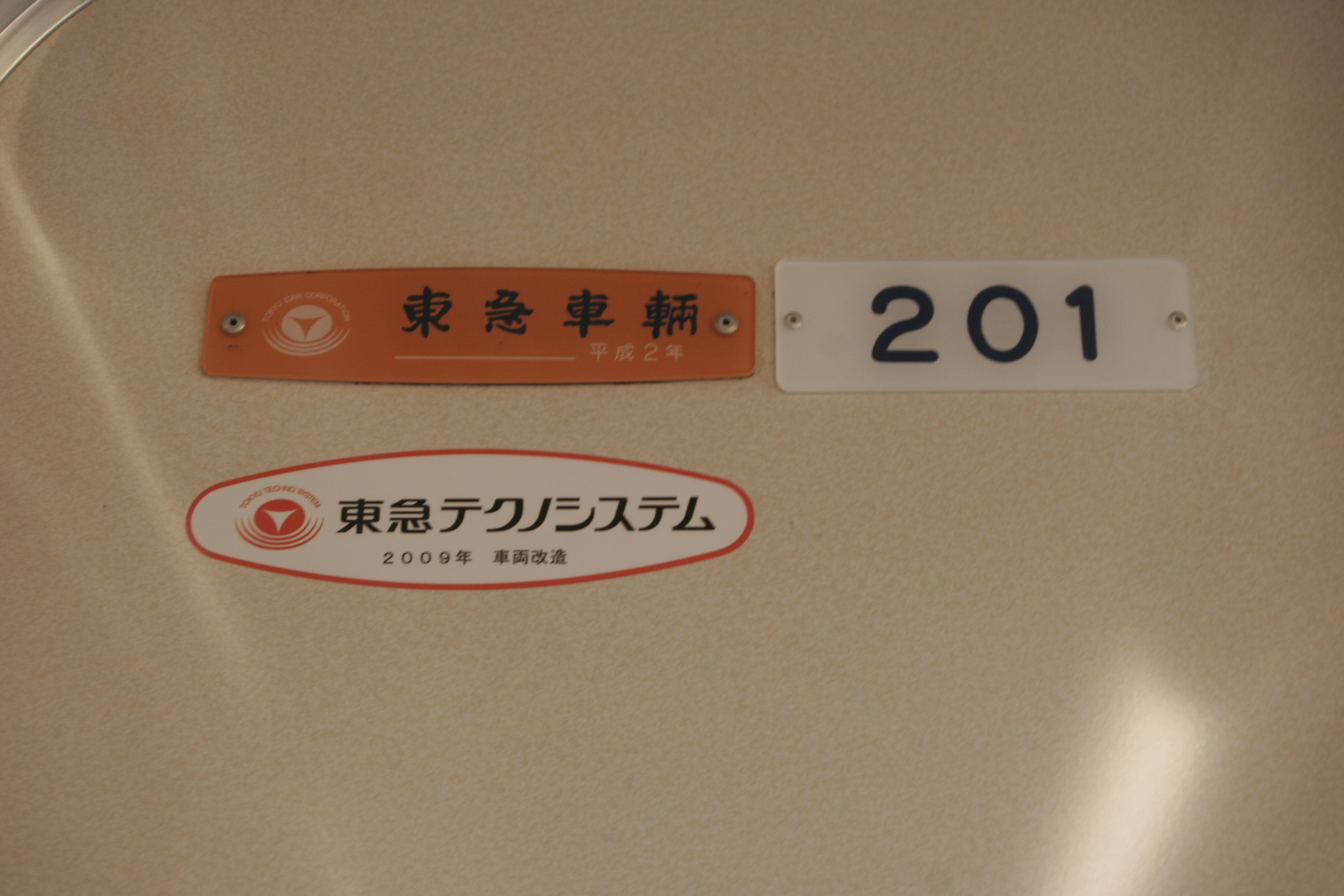
Tokyu Car Corporation manufacturer's plate

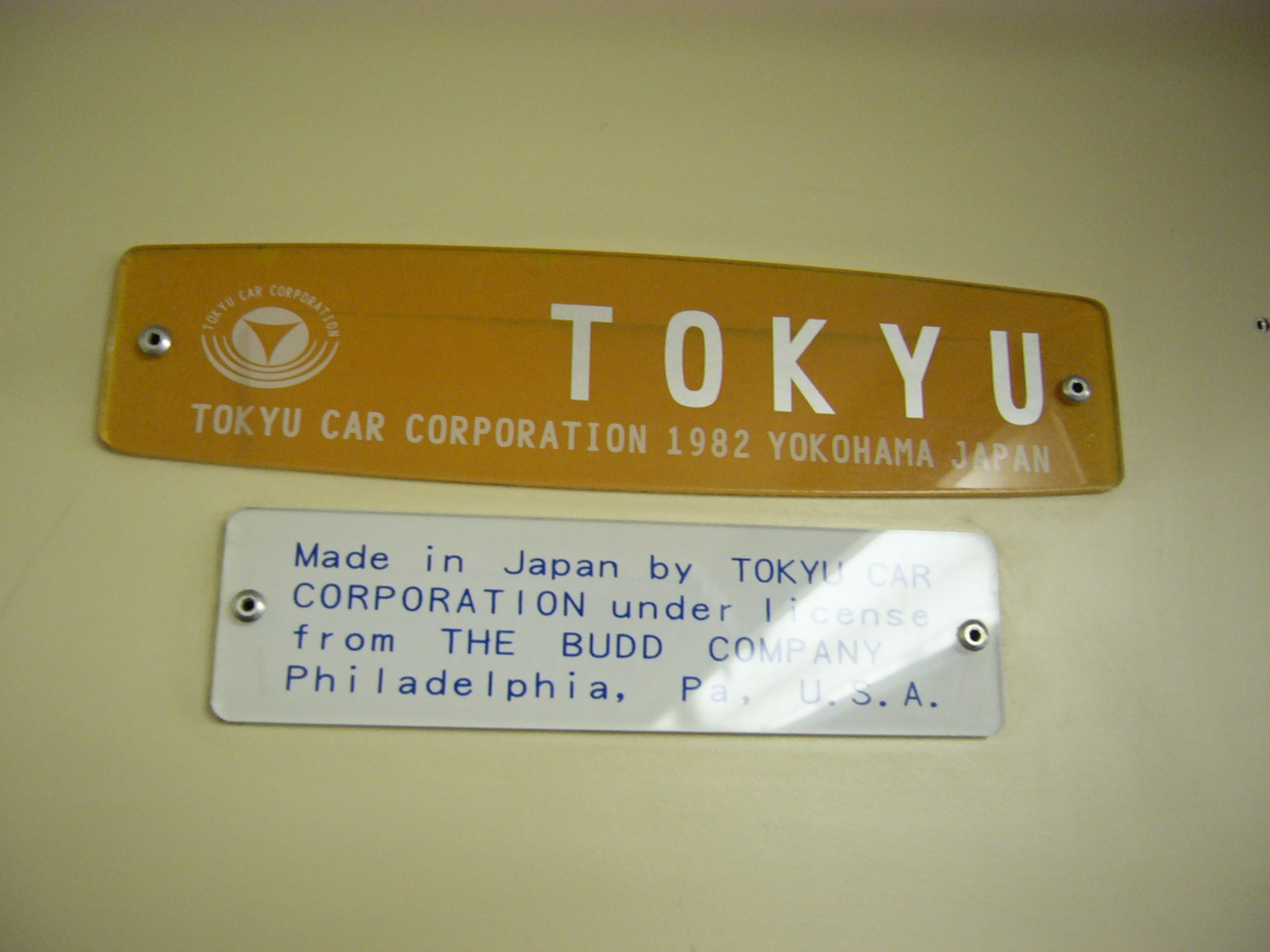
Tokyu Car Corporation and Budd Company manufacturer plates on a Taiwan Railways Administration DR2800 series DMU

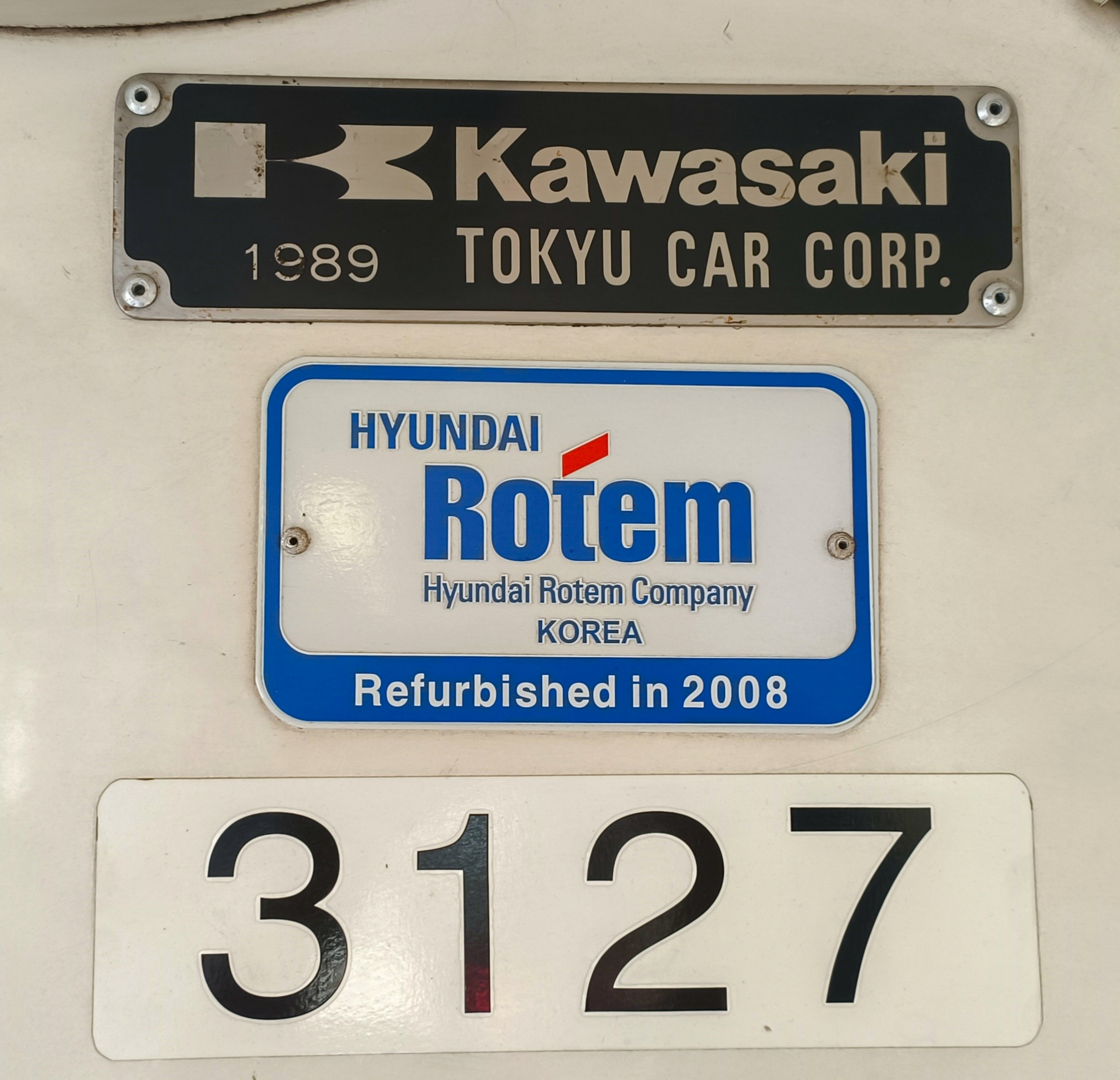
1989 Kawasaki-Tokyu Car Corporation builder's plate on a C151 Train from Singapore MRT

== Name after selling divisions ==
On 2 April 2012, divisions (were inherited by subsidiaries) were sold and renamed.

- JR East acquired:
  - New Tokyu Car Corporation (新東急車輛, Shin Tōkyū Sharyō) (founded on 9 November 2011, inherited rolling stock manufacturing division on 1 April 2012) - Name changed to Japan Transport Engineering Company (J-TREC) (総合車両製作所, Sōgō Sharyō Seisakusho)
    - Tokyu Car Engineering Corporation (東急車輛エンジニアリング, Tōkyū Sharyō Enjiniaringu) - Name changed to J-TREC Design & Service Company (J-TREC D & S) (J-TRECデザインサービス)
    - Keihin Steel Works Corporation (京浜鋼板工業, Keihin Kōban Kōgyō)
- ShinMaywa acquired:
  - Tokyu Car SPV Corporation (東急車輛特装, Tōkyū Sharyō Tokusō) - Name changed to Toho Car Corporation (東邦車輛, Tōhō Sharyō)
    - Tokyu Car Service Corporation (東急車輛サービス, Tōkyū Sharyō Sābisu) - Name changed to Toho Car Service Corporation (東邦車輛サービス, Tōhō Sharyō Sābisu)
  - New Tokyu Parking Corporation (新東急パーキング, Shin Tōkyū Pākingu) (founded on 9 November 2011, inherited parking machinery manufacturing division on 1 April 2012) - Name changed to Tokyo Engineering Systems Corporation (東京エンジニアリングシステムズ, Tōkyō Enjiniaringu Shisutemuzu)
    - Tokyu Parking Systems Corporation (東急パーキングシステムズ, Tōkyū Pākingu Shisutemuzu) - Name changed to Tokyo Parking Systems Corporation (東京パーキングシステムズ, Tōkyō Pākingu Shisutemuzu)

== Products ==
=== As Tokyu Car Corporation ===
Besides railway rolling stock, Tokyu Car also manufactured special duty motor vehicles (such as dump trucks, trailers and vans), which was sold to ShinMaywa.

Some Tokyu Car projects:

- Shinkansen EMU Cars
- Tokyu Corporation all trains.
- JR East 209, E217, E231, E501, E531 and E233 series EMU rail cars
- JR East E751 series EMU rail cars for limited express (2000)
- JR Shikoku 5100 type bilevel cab cars (2003)
- E259 series EMU for Narita Express with Kinki Sharyo
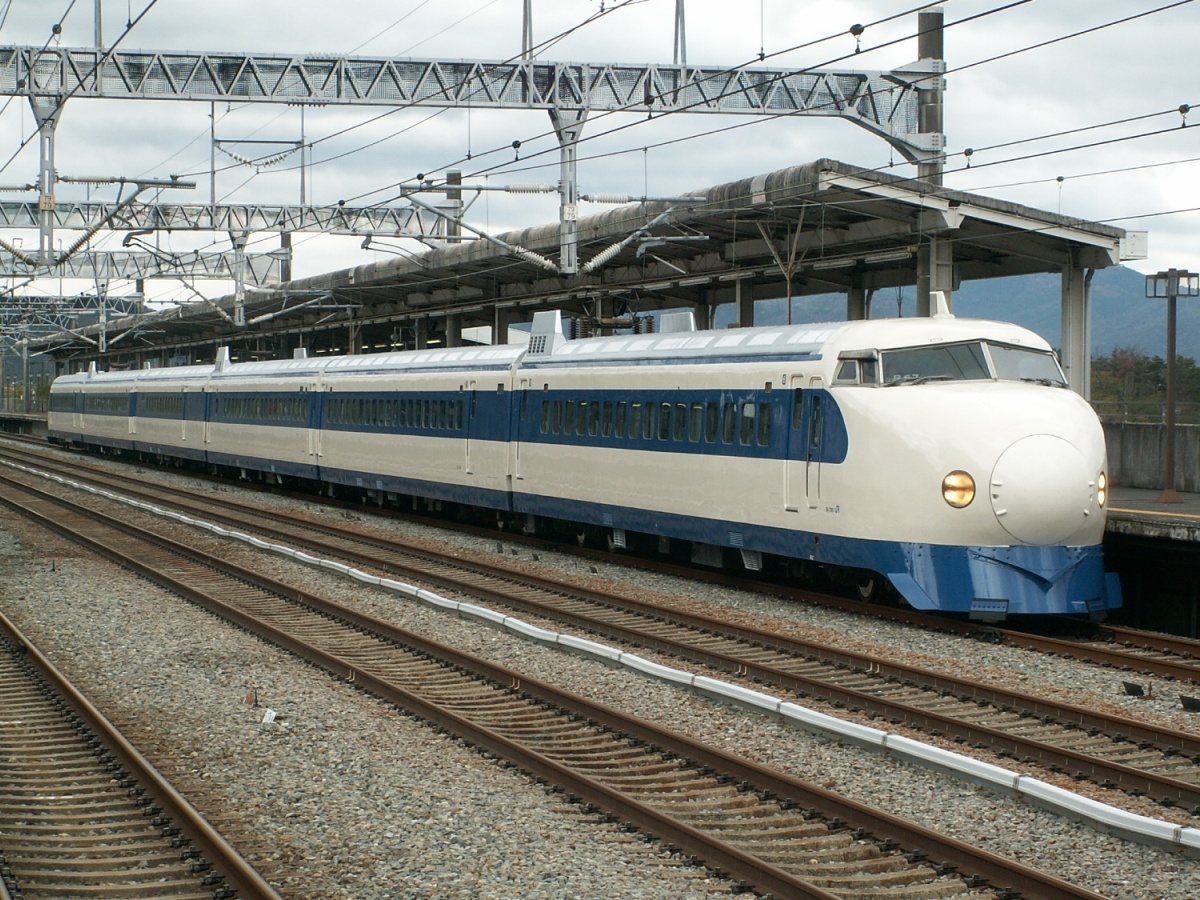
0 series shinkansen

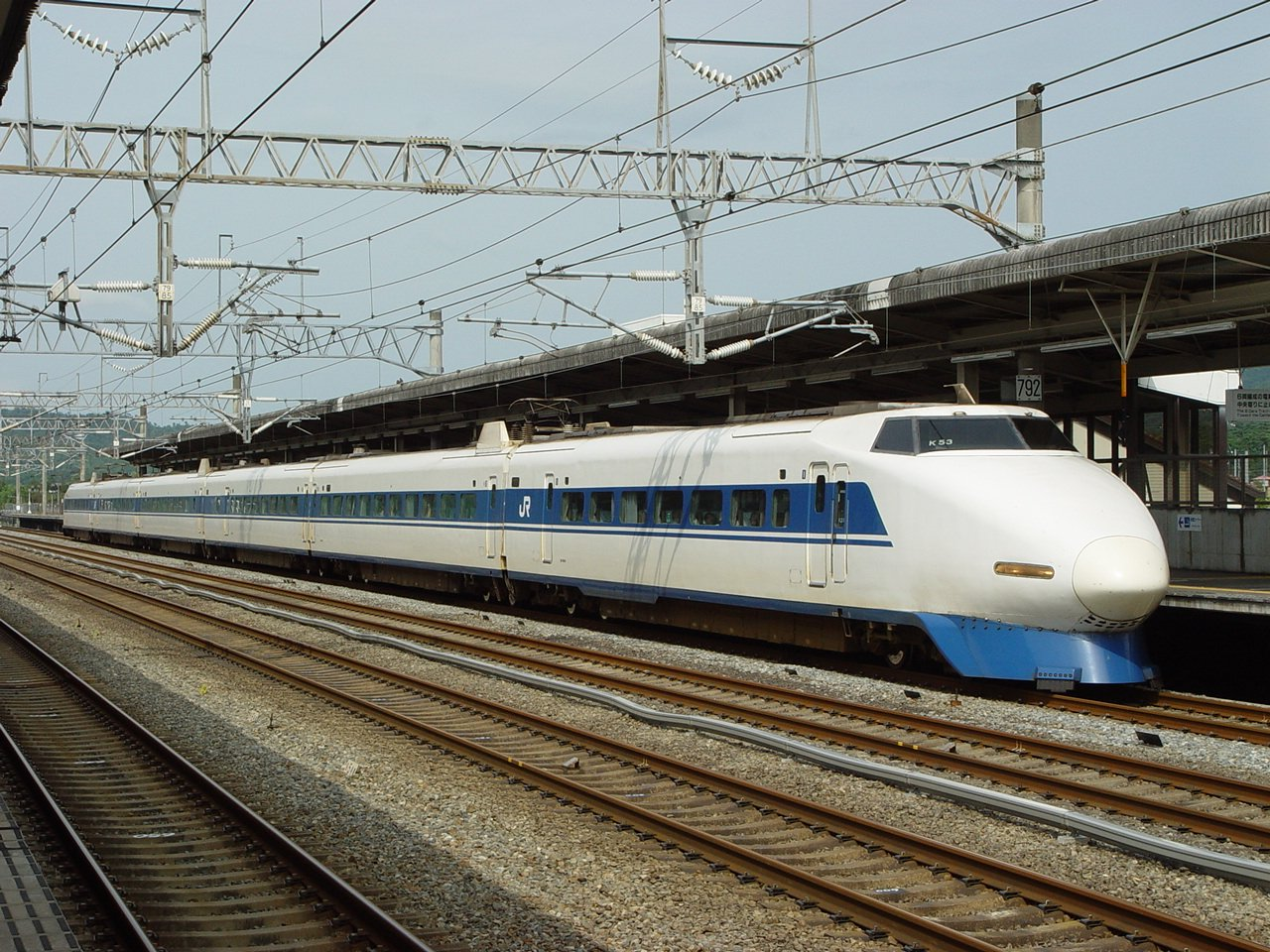
100 series shinkansen

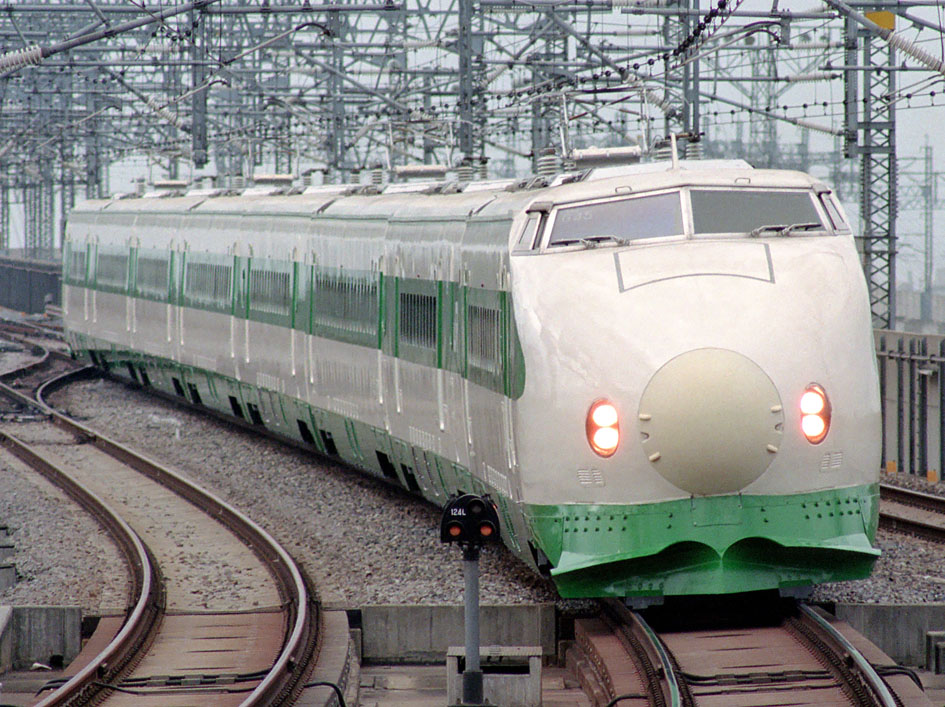
200 series shinkansen

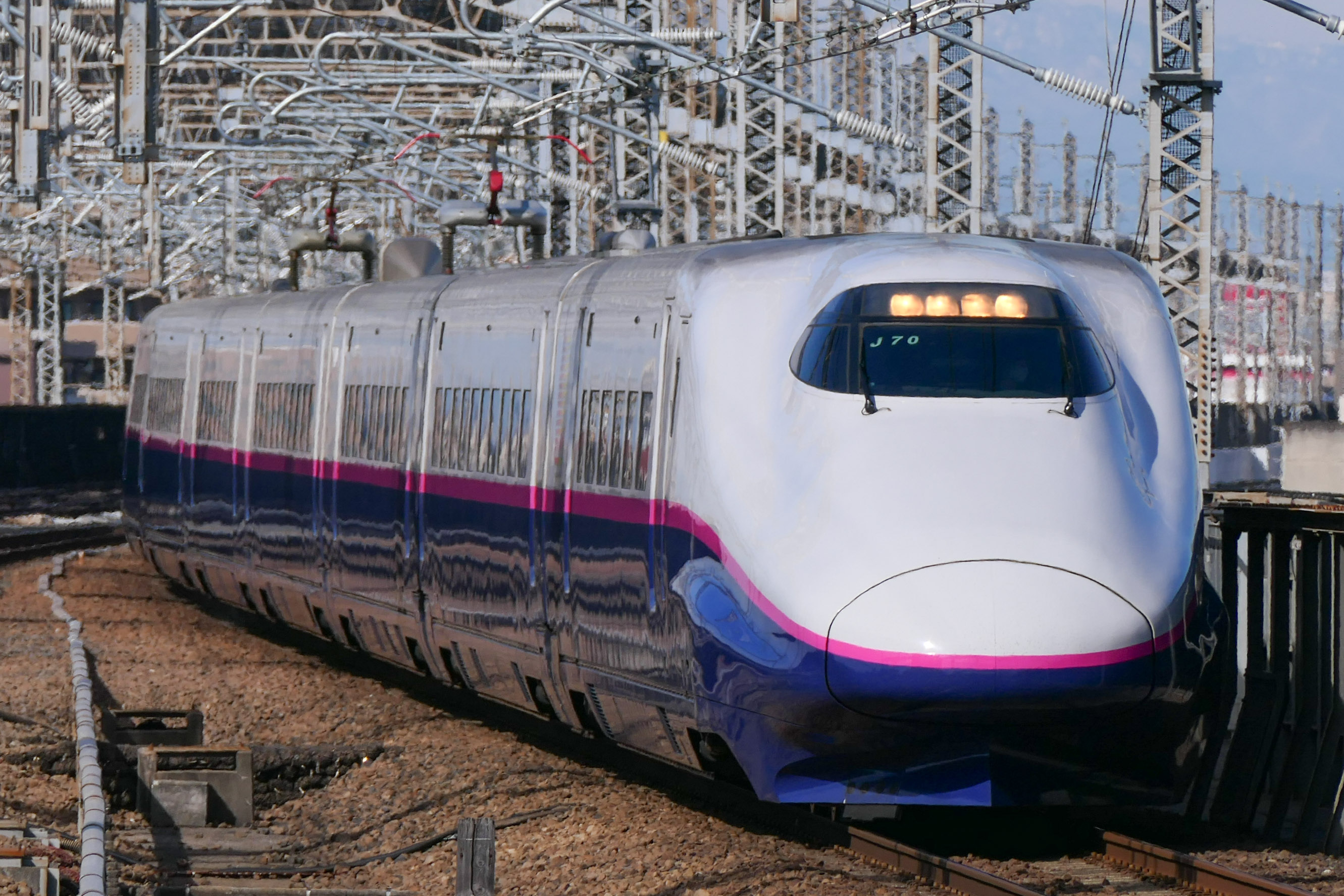
E2 series shinkansen

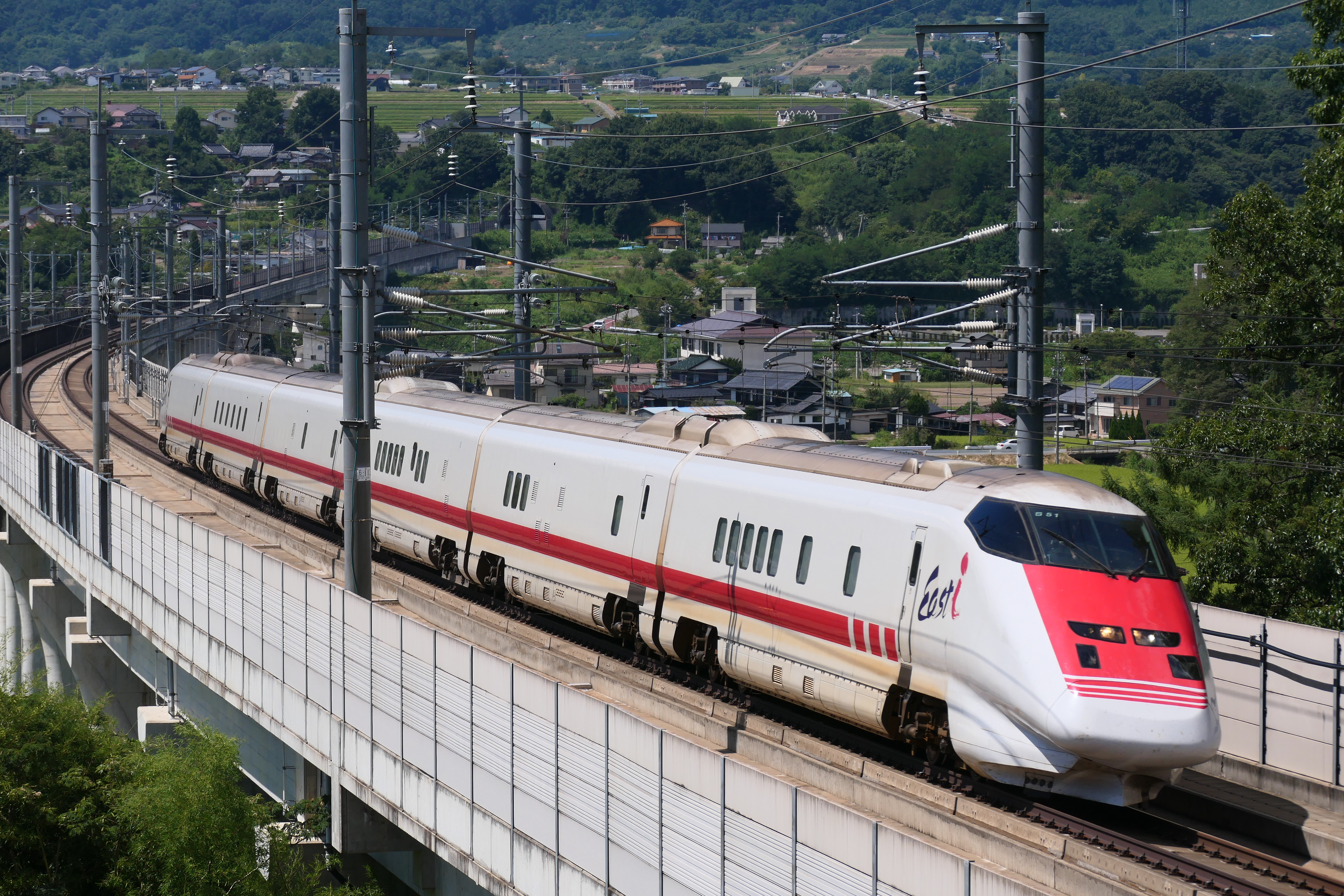
E926 series shinkansen

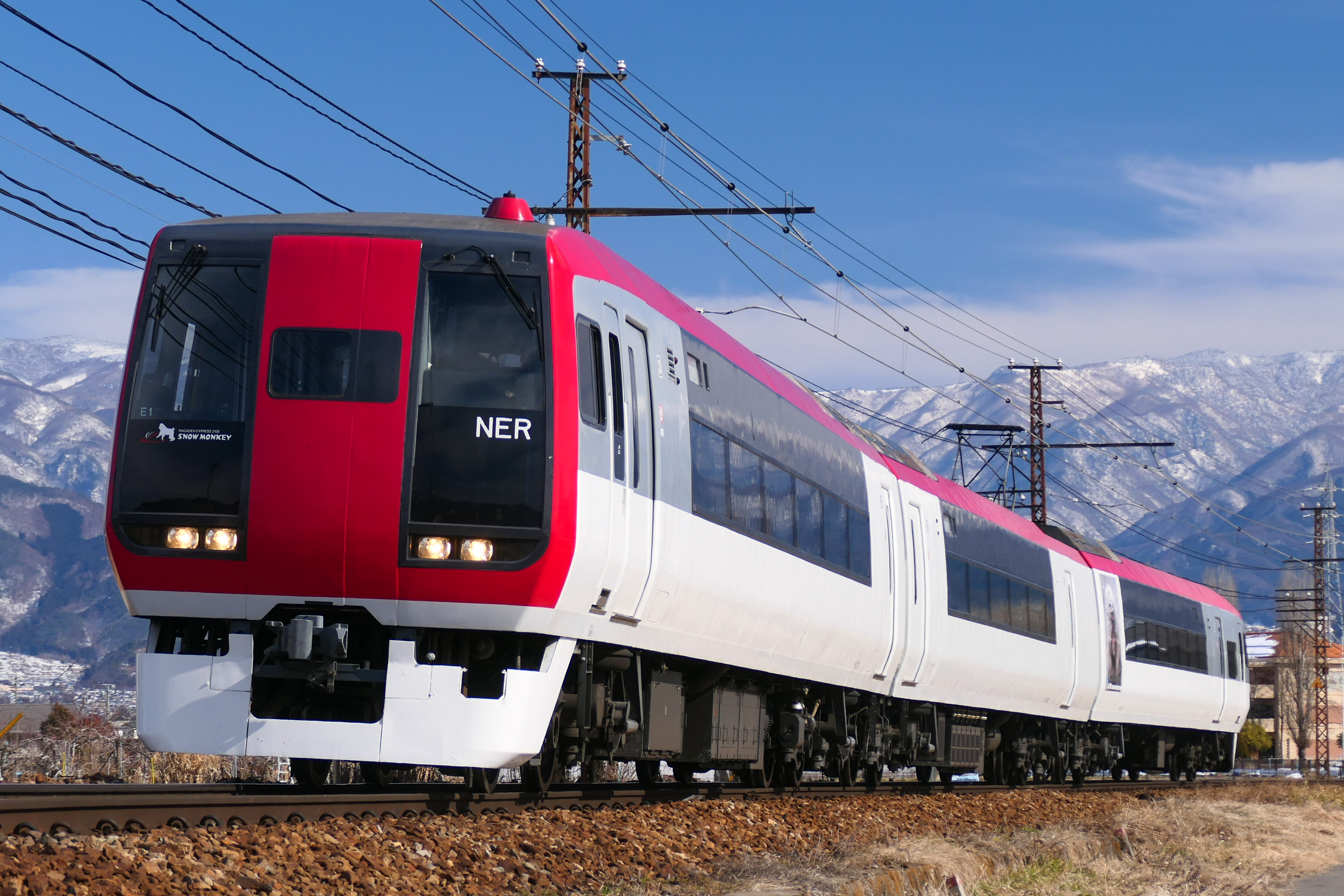
JR 253 series EMU (Nagano electric railway 2100 series)

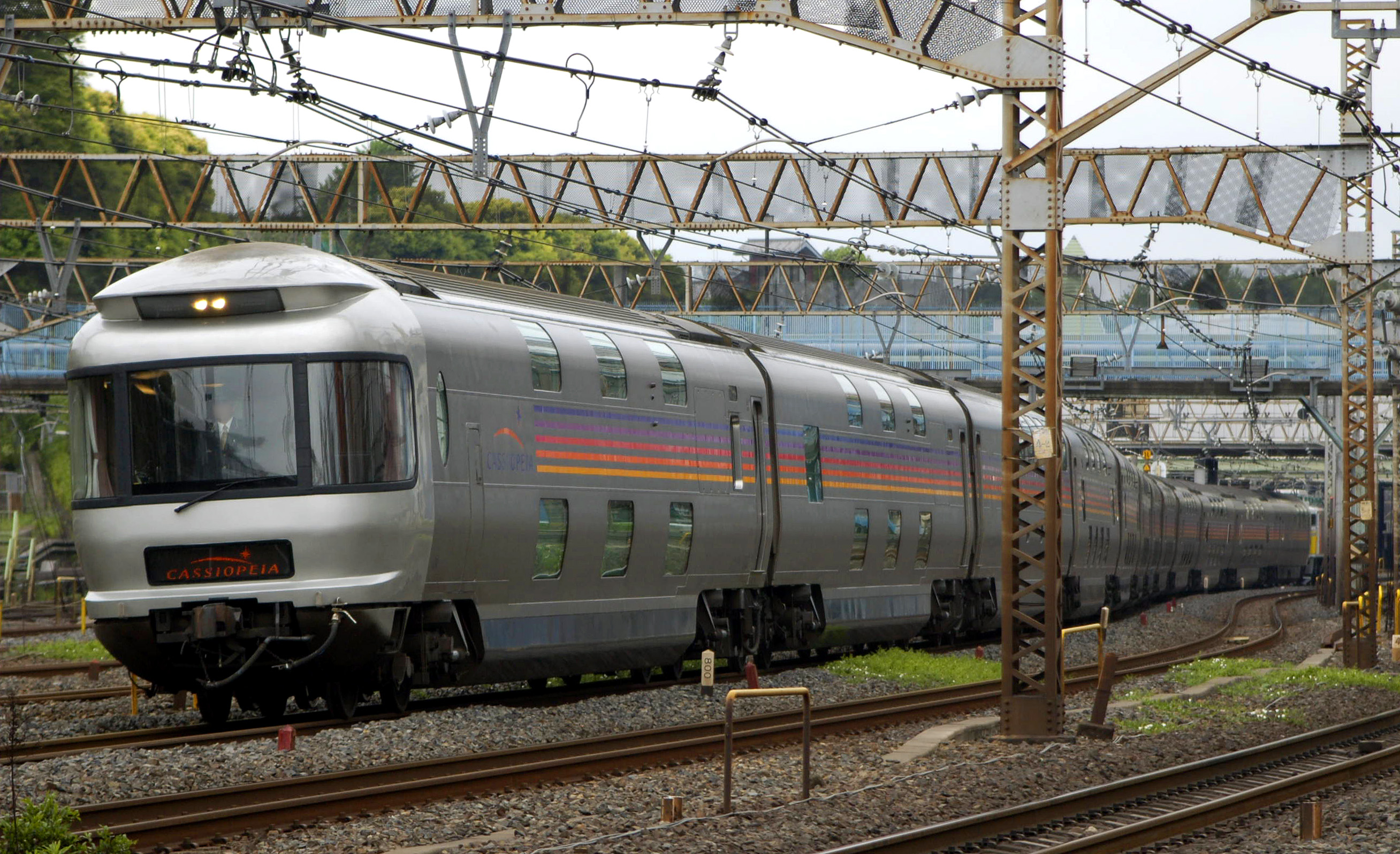
E26 sleeping coach

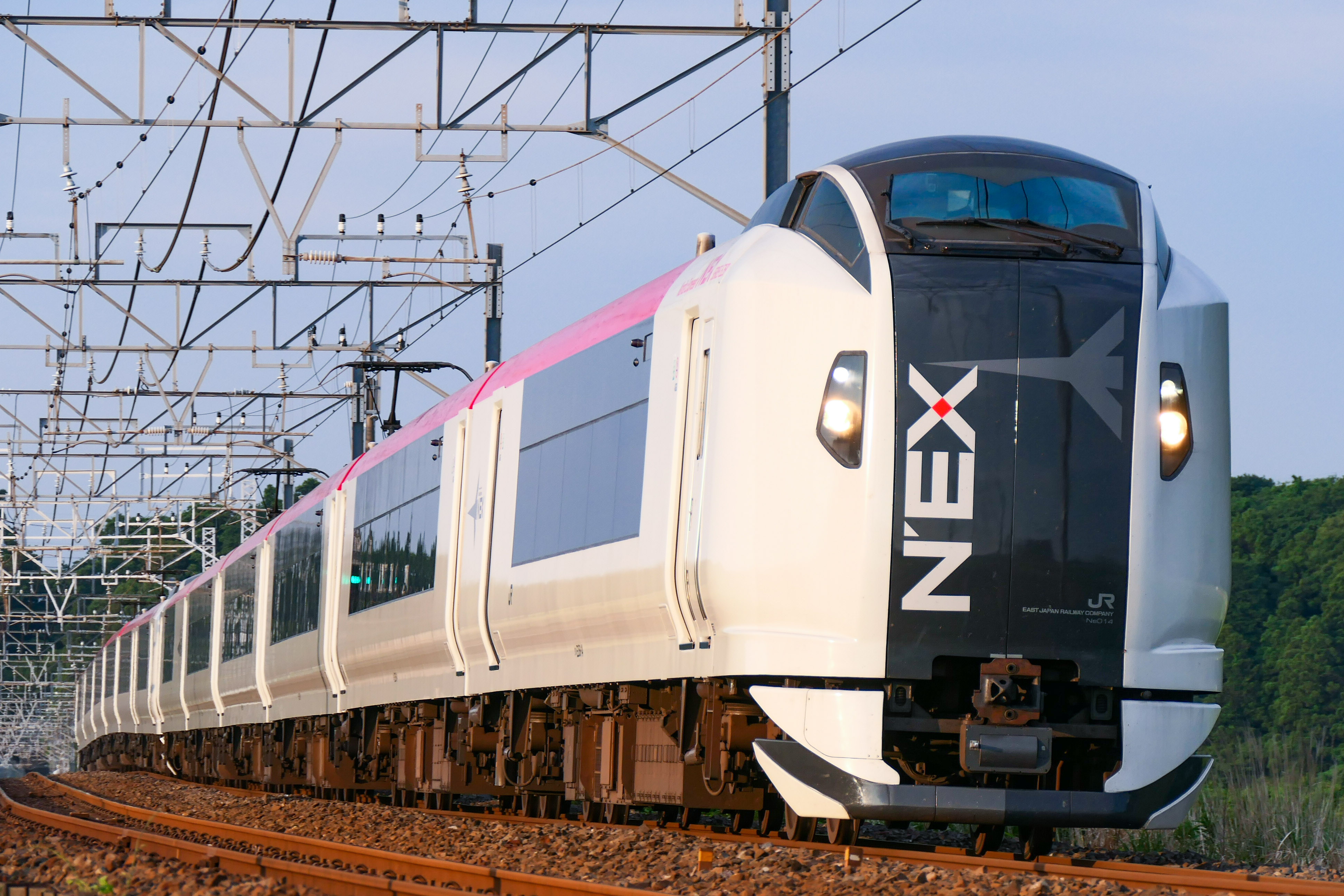
E259 Narita EXpress

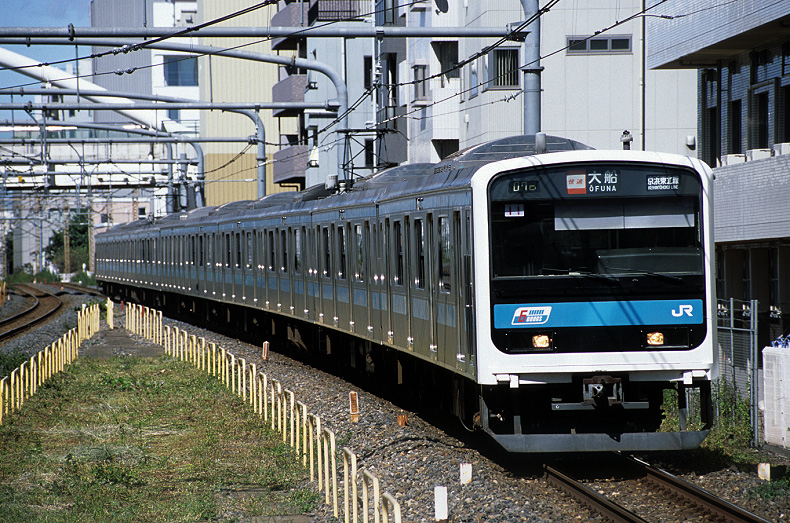
209 series EMU

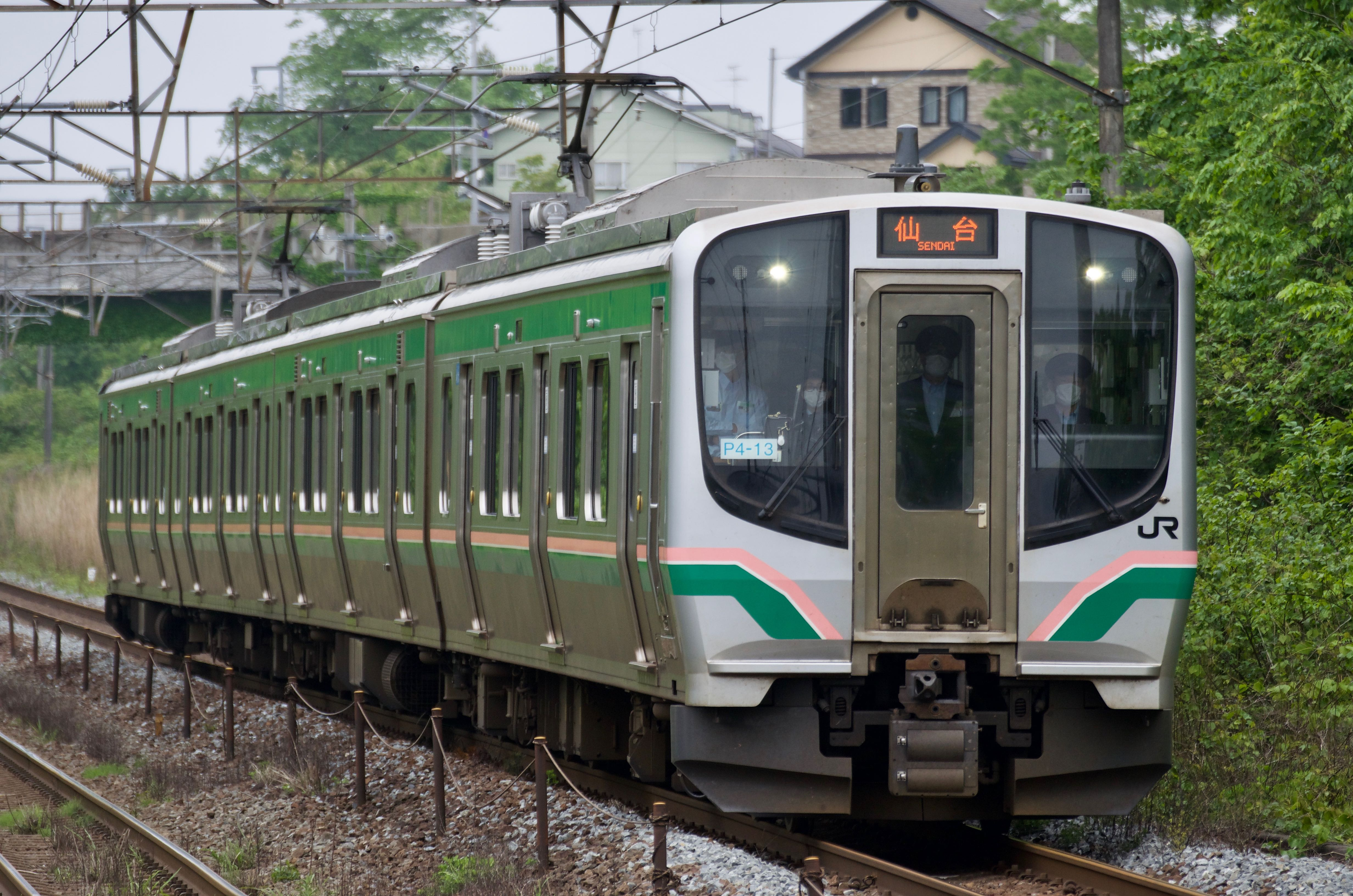
E721 series EMU

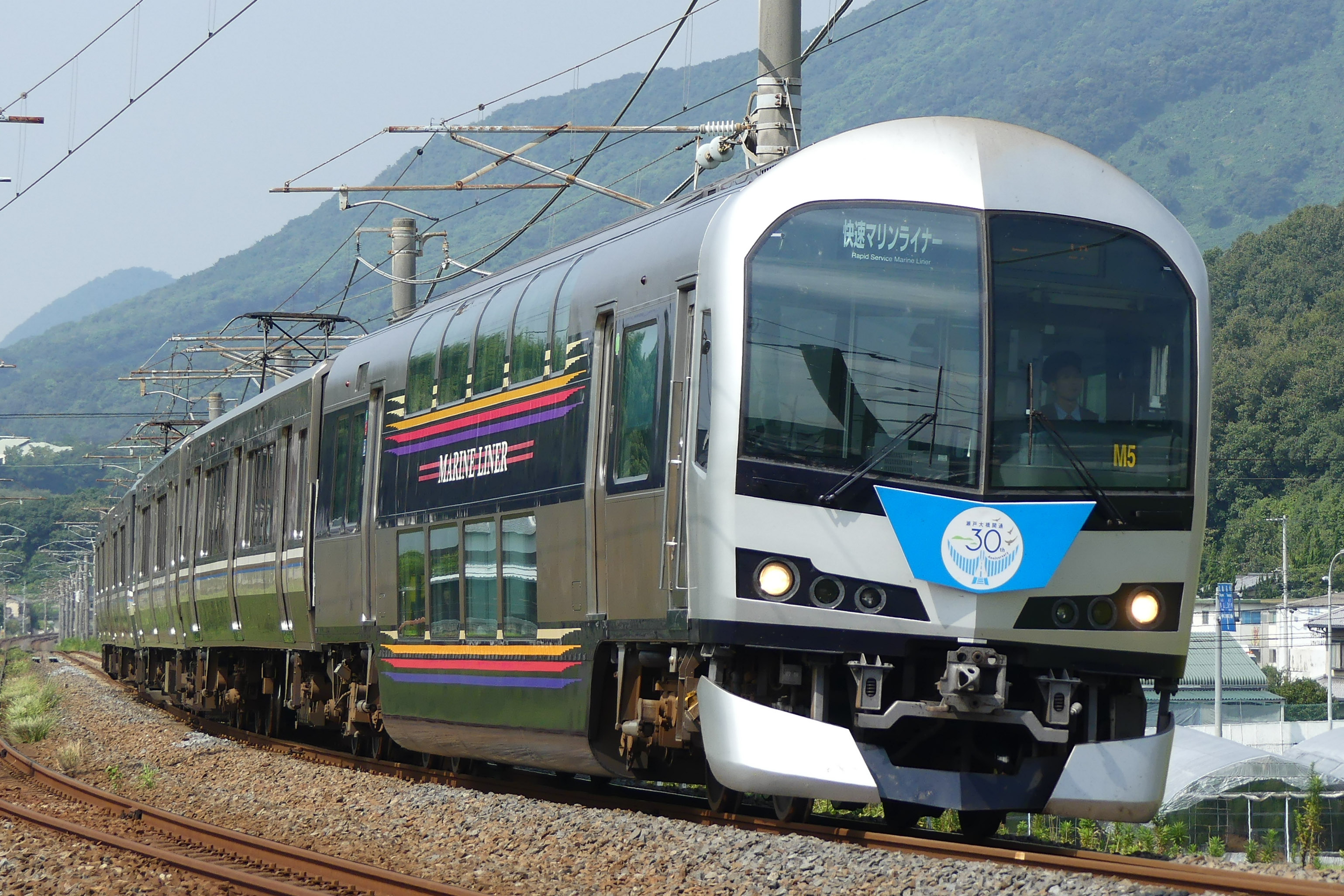
JR Shikoku 5100 series Marine liner

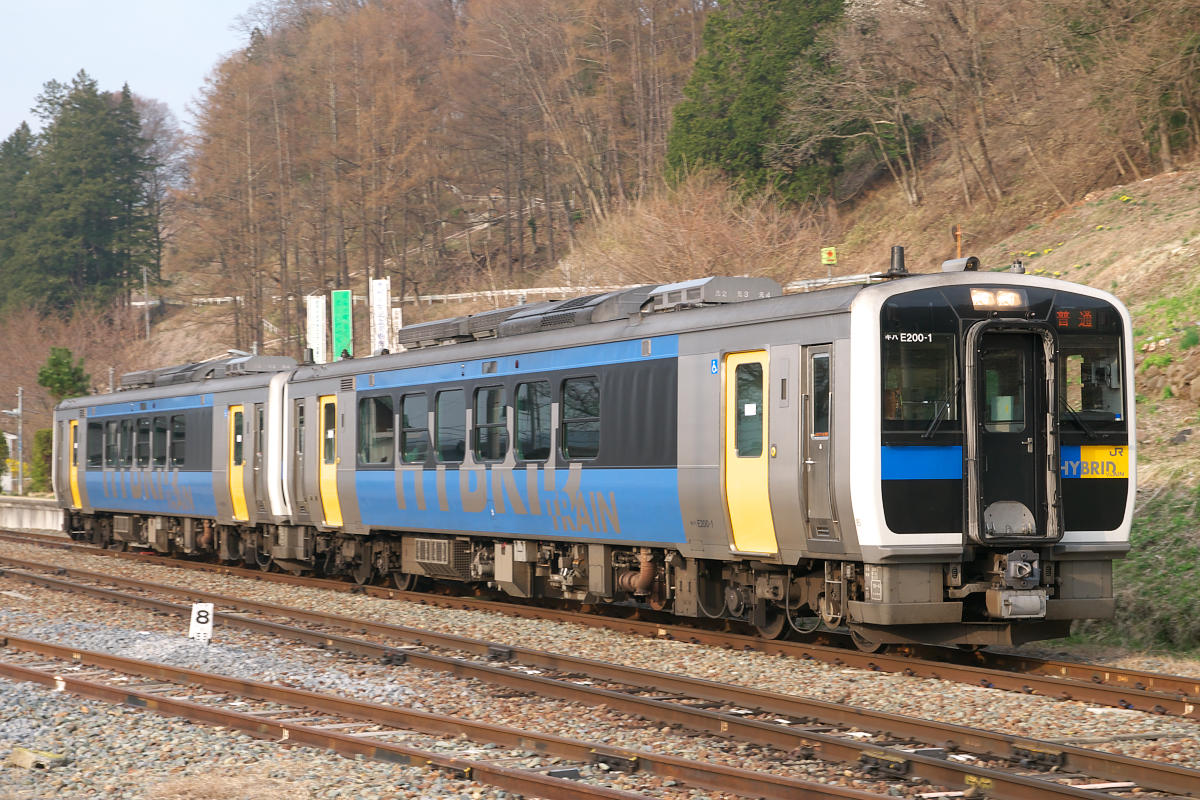
Kiha E200 hybrid DMU

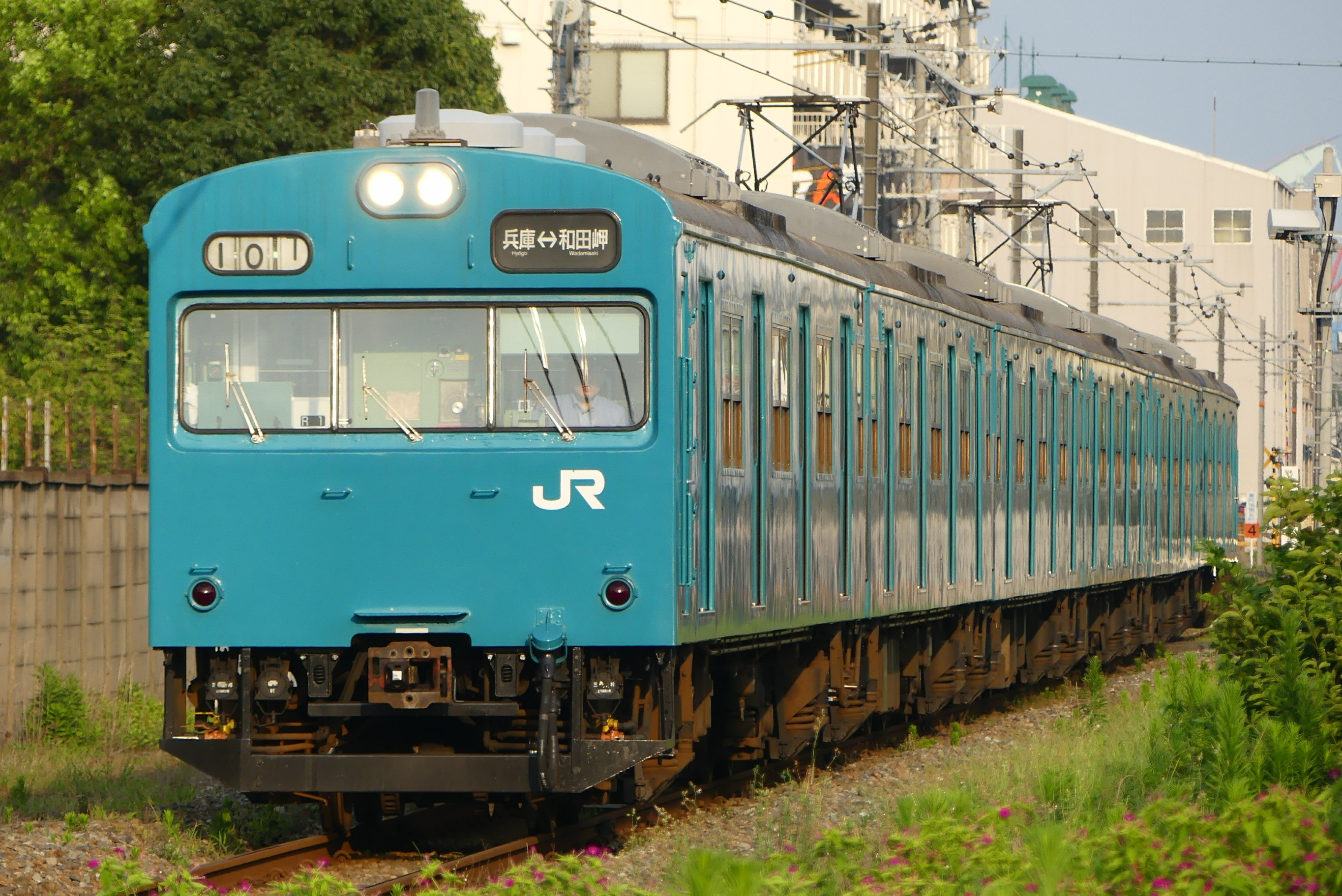
103 series EMU

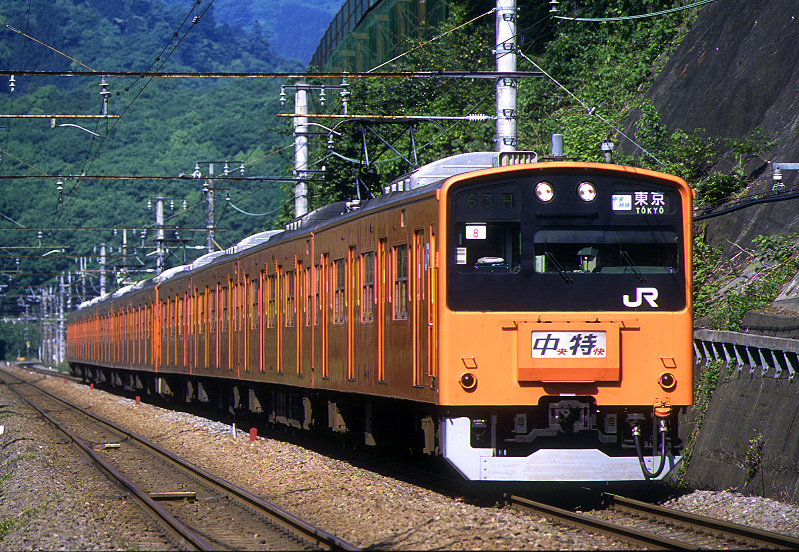
201 series EMU

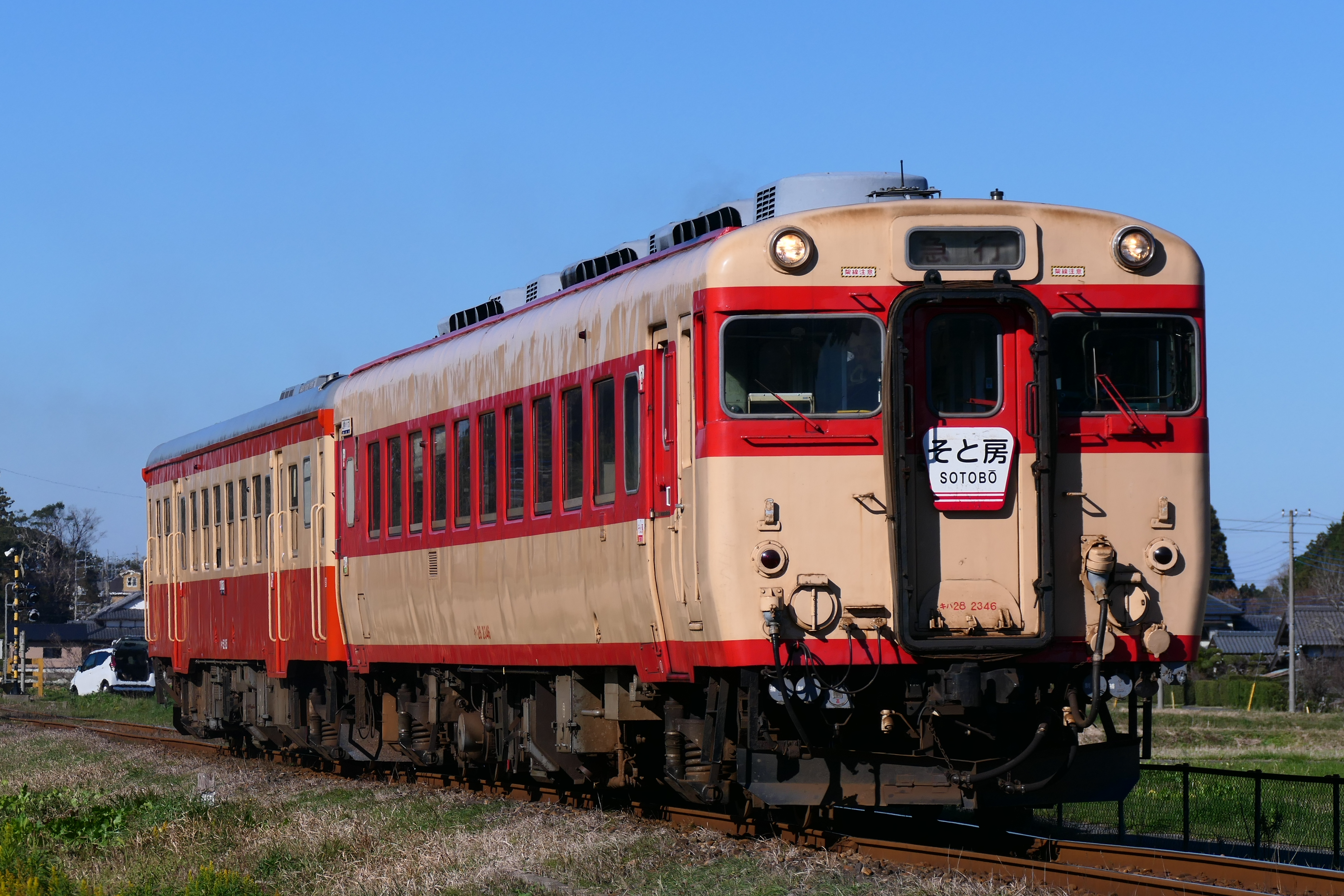
Kiha 58 series DMU

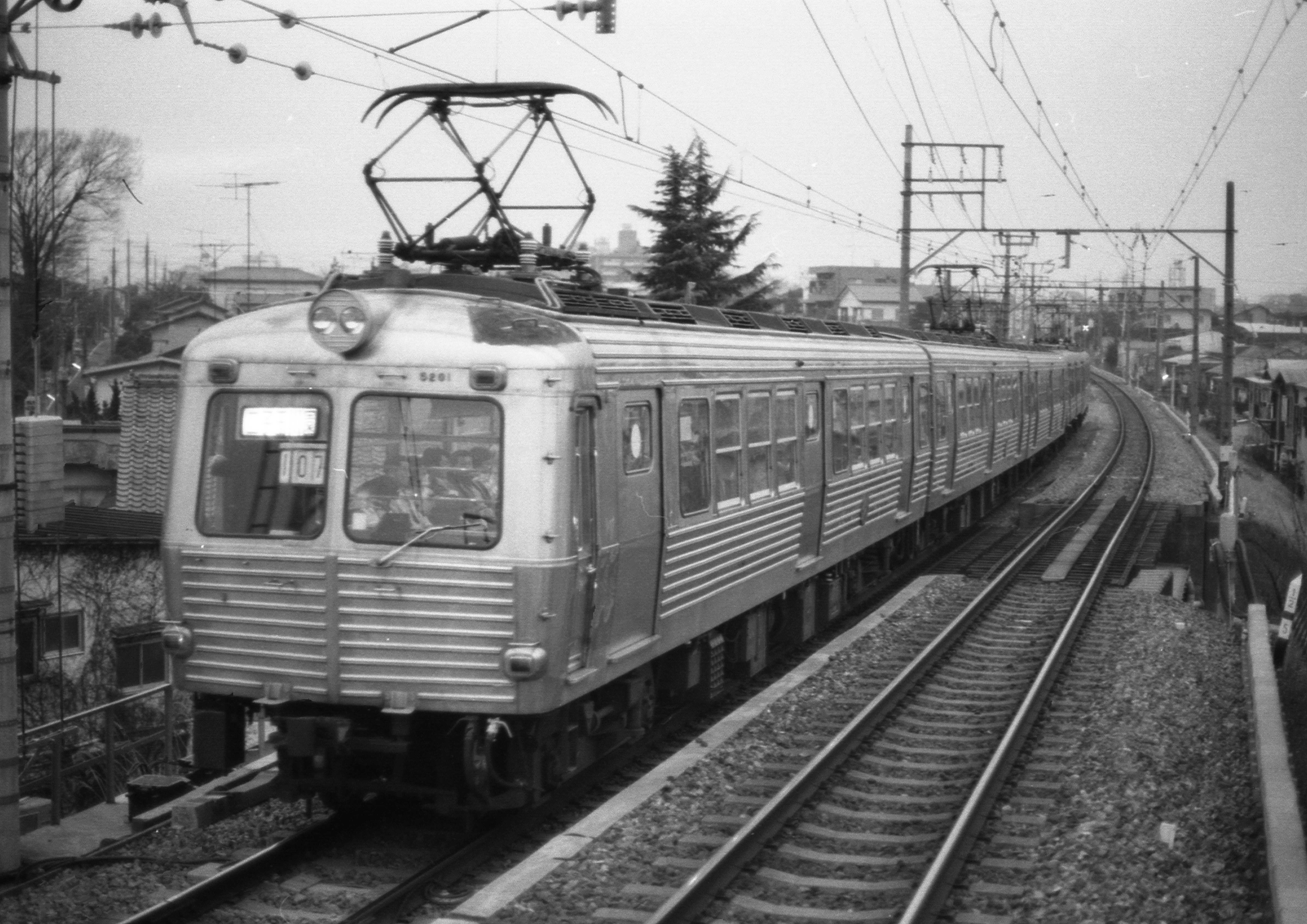
Tokyu 5200 series EMU

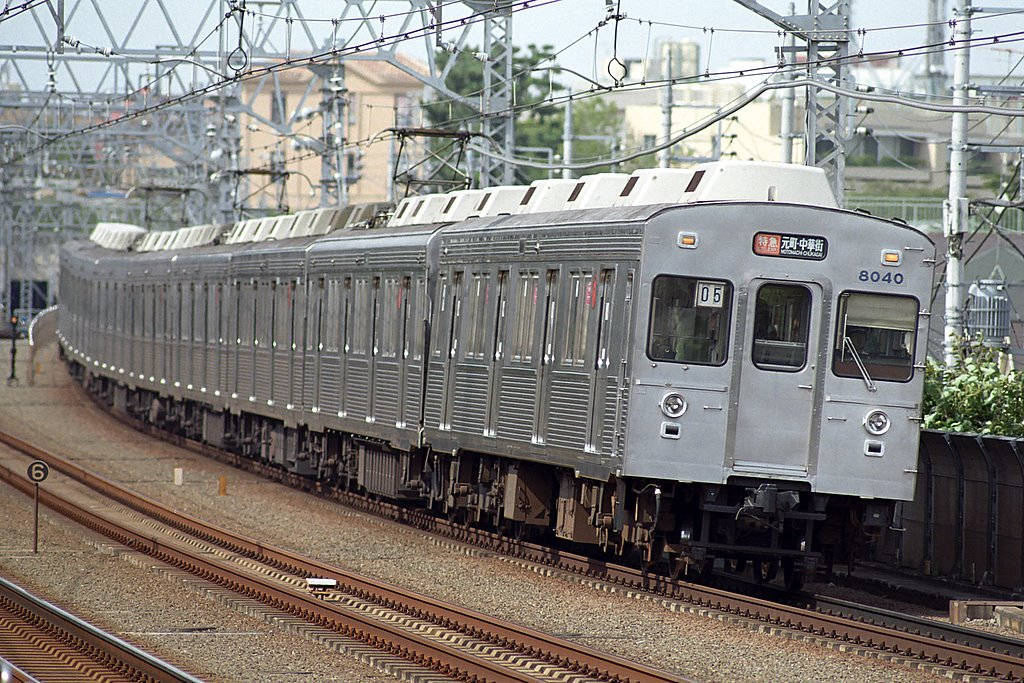
Tokyu 8000 series

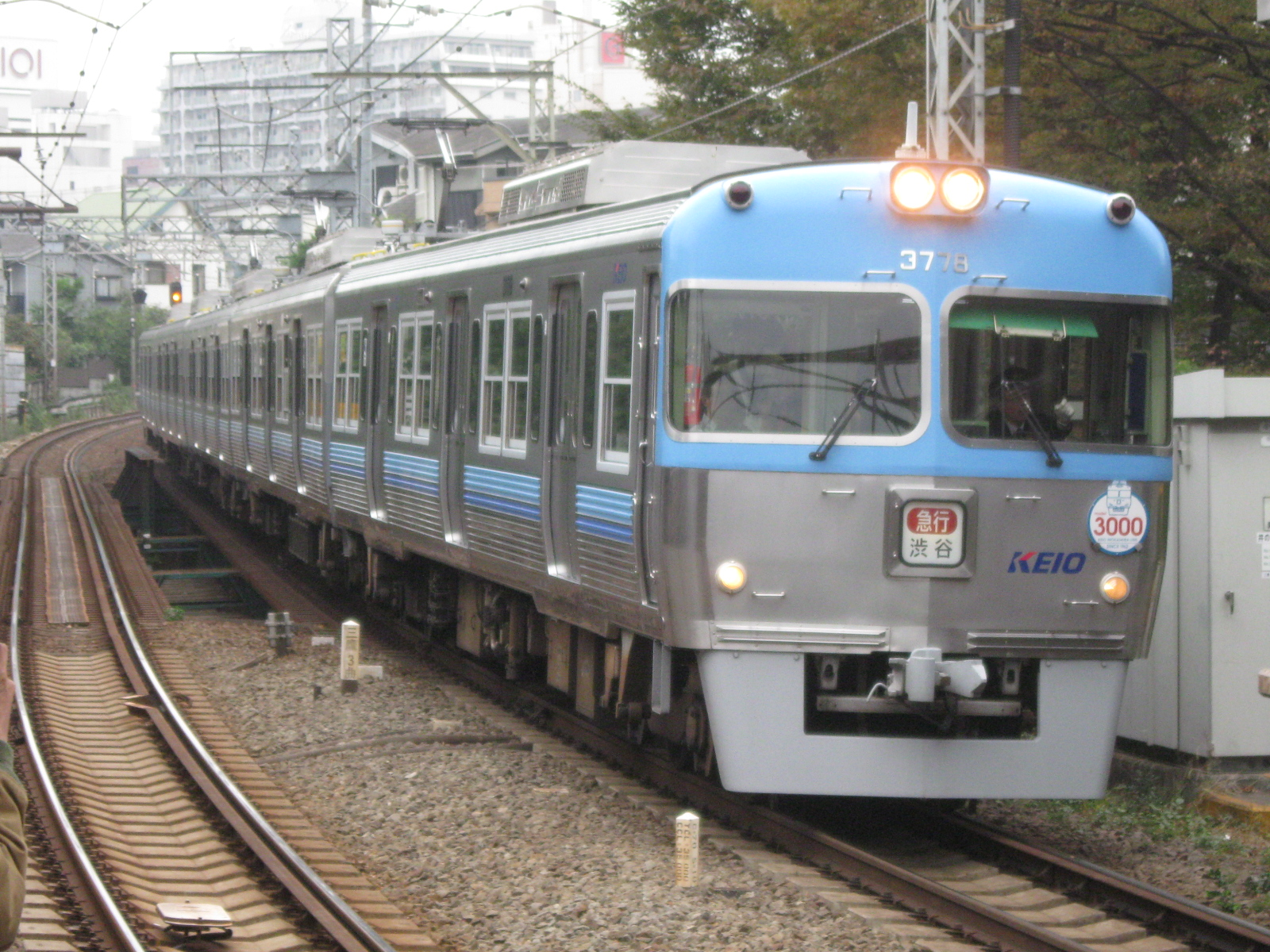
Keio 3000 series

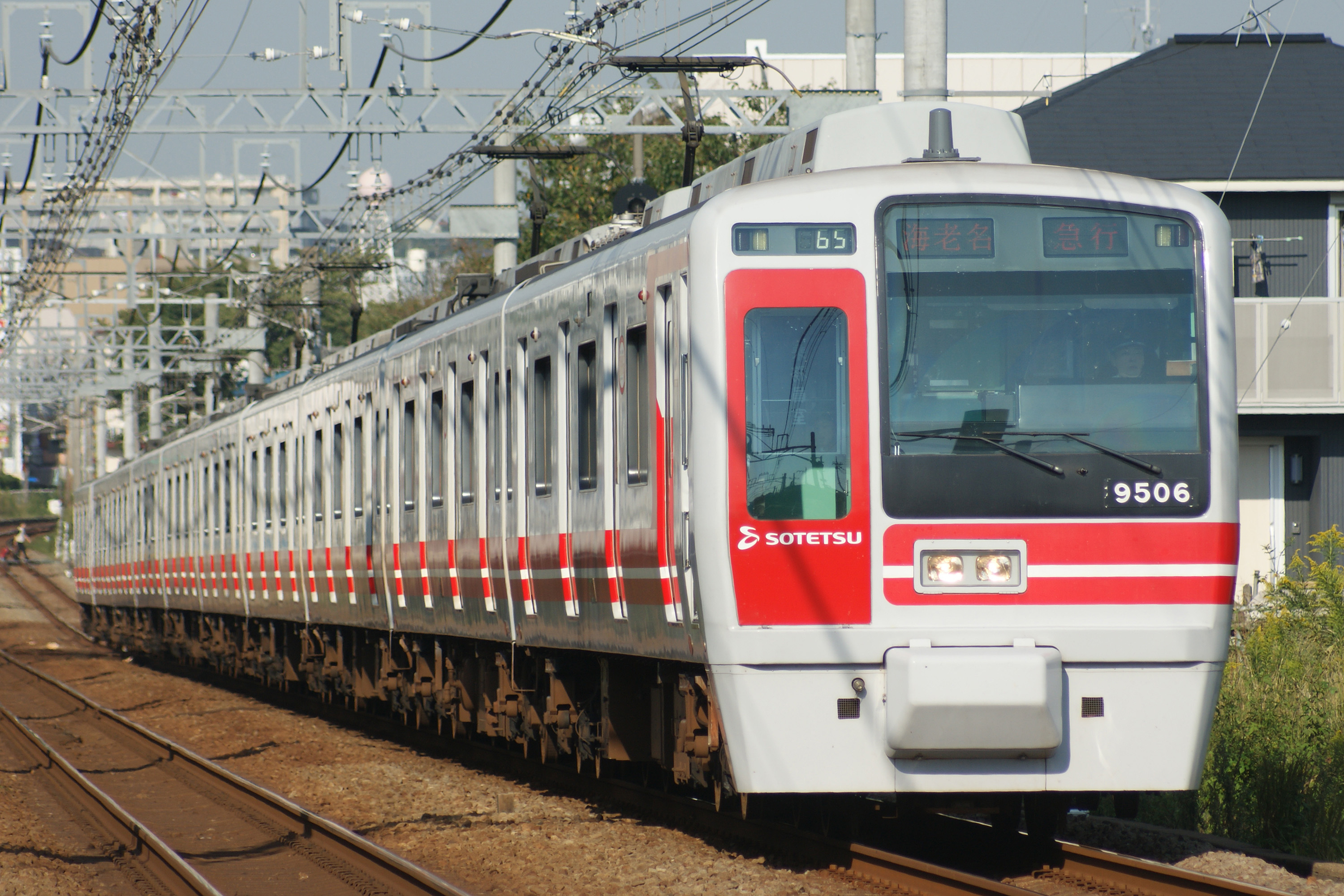
Sotetsu 9000 series

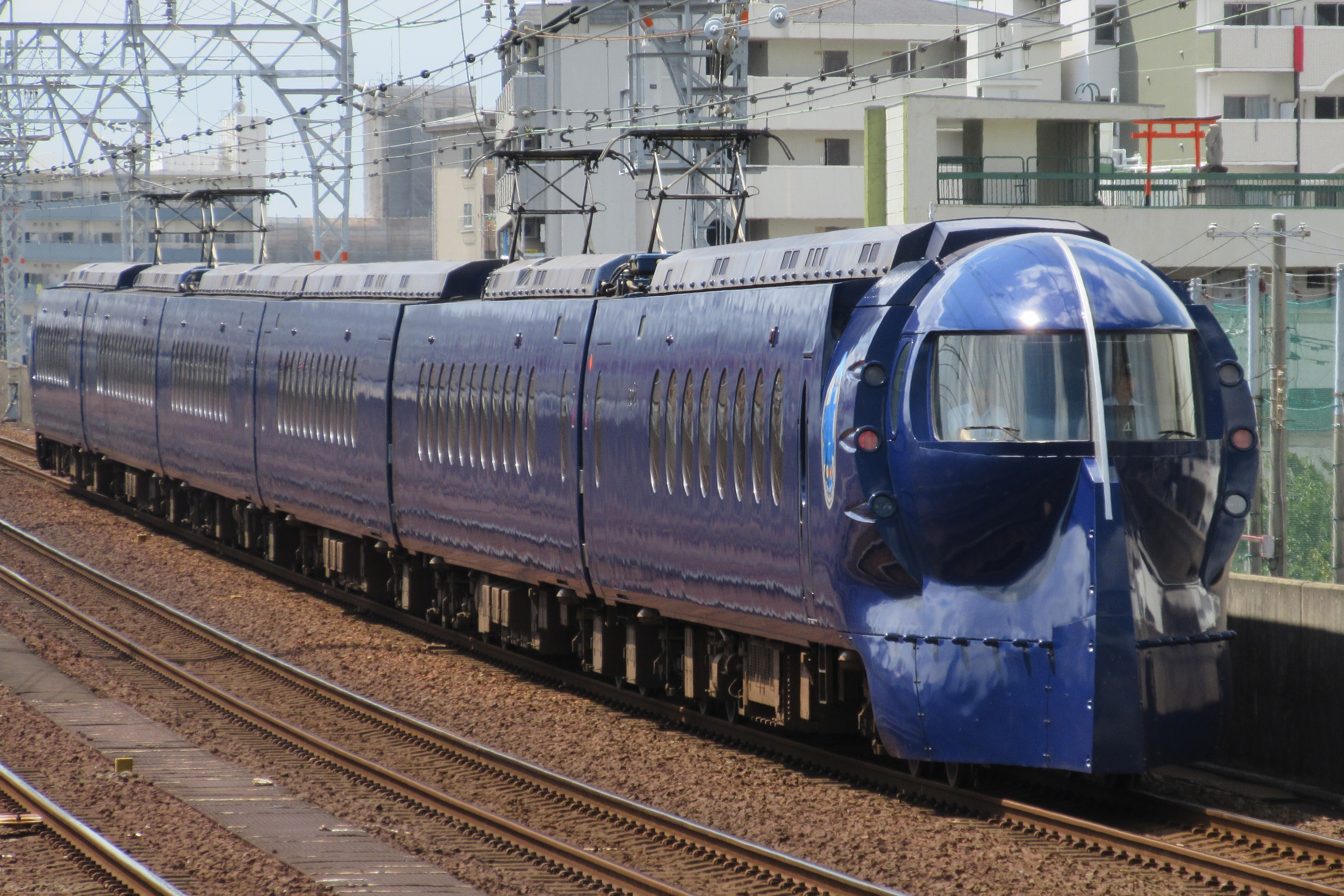
Nankai 50000 series

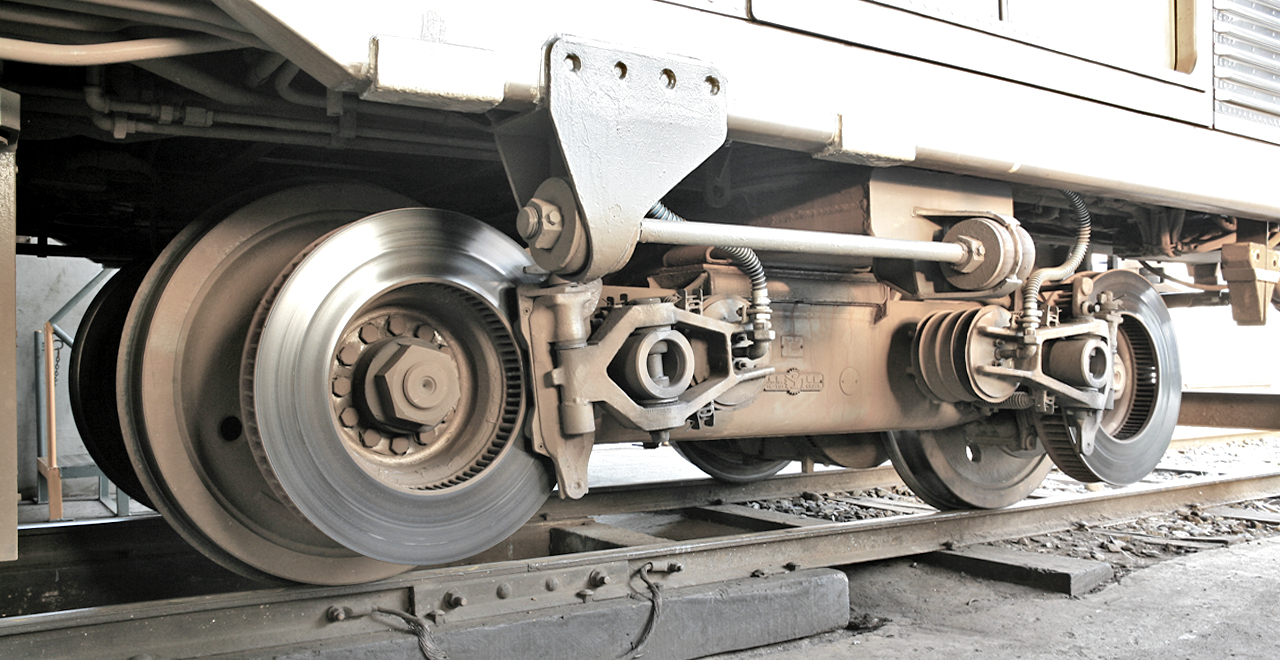
Type TS701 truck of Mizuma Railway 1000 Series EMU built under license from Budd Company in the early 1960s

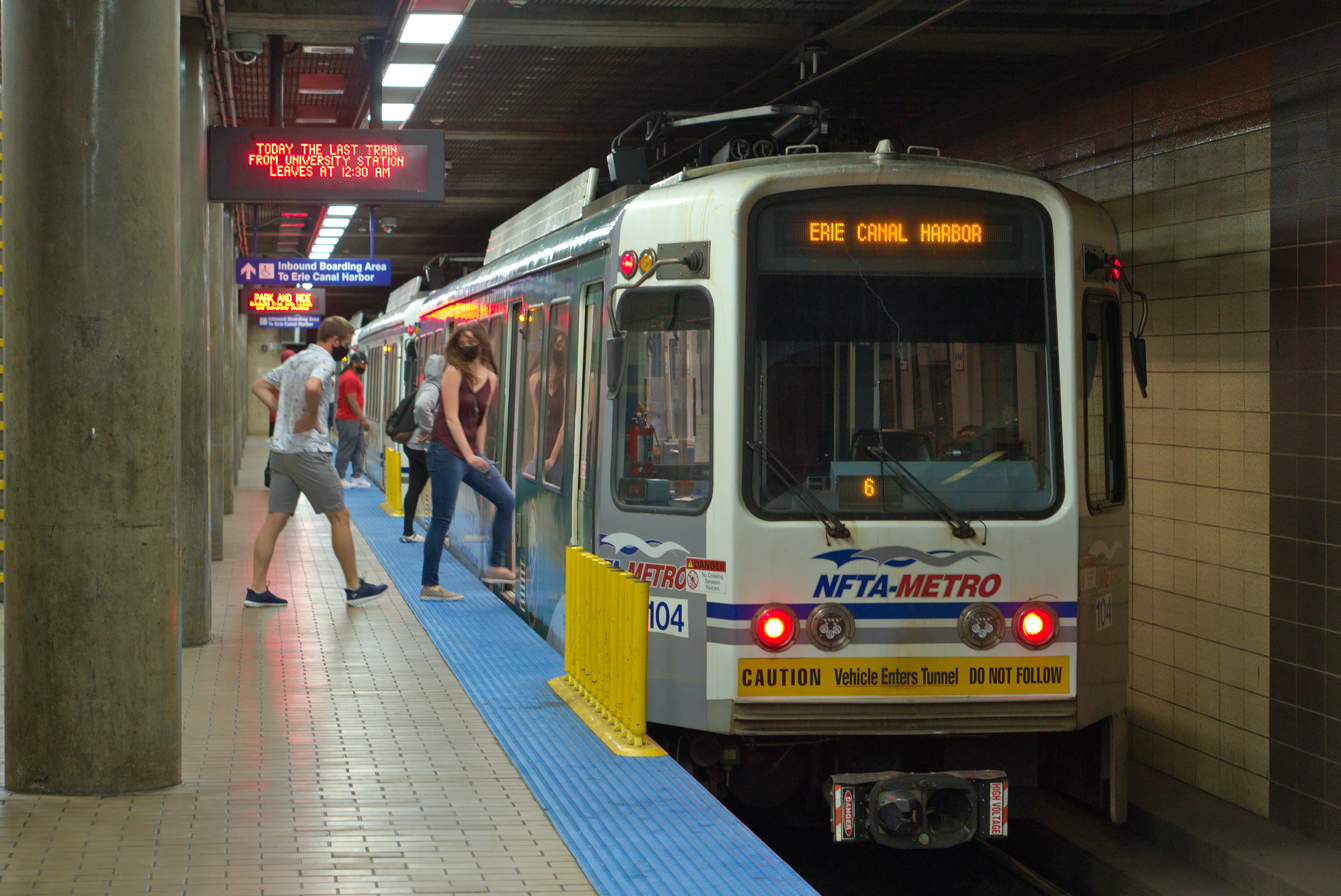
Buffalo Metro Rail LRV
- Singapore MRT Kawasaki Heavy Industries C151 EMU cars with Kawasaki Heavy Industries, Nippon Sharyo and Kinki Sharyo
- Greater Cleveland Regional Transit Authority Red Line heavy rail cars
- Niagara Frontier Transportation Authority Metro Rail LRV
- US Standard Light Rail Vehicle (carshells built for Boeing Vertol)
- Iarnród Éireann/Irish Rail DART Dublin Area Rapid Transit fleet expansion EMU railcars 8500, 8510 and 8520 Classes (Dublin) with Mitsui (lead contractor)
- Iarnród Éireann/Irish Rail Commuter (formerly Arrow), both 2600 Class (original) and fleet expansion 2800 Class. (Operate on Commuter routes in Cork and Limerick) with Mitsui (lead contractor)
- Iarnród Éireann/Irish Rail InterCity (National express passenger services) fleet replacement. Tokyu Car was the bogie supplier for a fleet of high specialist 22000 Class DMUs capable of 160 km/h operation. These rolled out between 2007 and 2011 and operate services on all Irish Rail routes, except key Cork-Dublin Express services operated by CAF built Mark 4 push-pull trains capable of 200 km/h operation but run at 160 km/h at present and the Dublin-Belfast Enterprise operated by De Dietrich built push-pull stock limited to 145 km/h operating speeds. The lead contractor was Mitsui. Coaches were built by Rotem and specialist diesel-hydraulic power packs were built by MTU Friedrichshafen (engine) and Voith (transmission system).
- Taiwan Railways Administration DR2700, DR2800 series
- State Railway of Thailand THN diesel railcars, also built by Hitachi and Nippon Sharyo
- Metro-North Commuter Railroad (New York) M-4 EMU car for its New Haven Line (1988)
- Long Island Rail Road C1 bilevel commuter cars, with Commonwealth Engineering and Mitsui
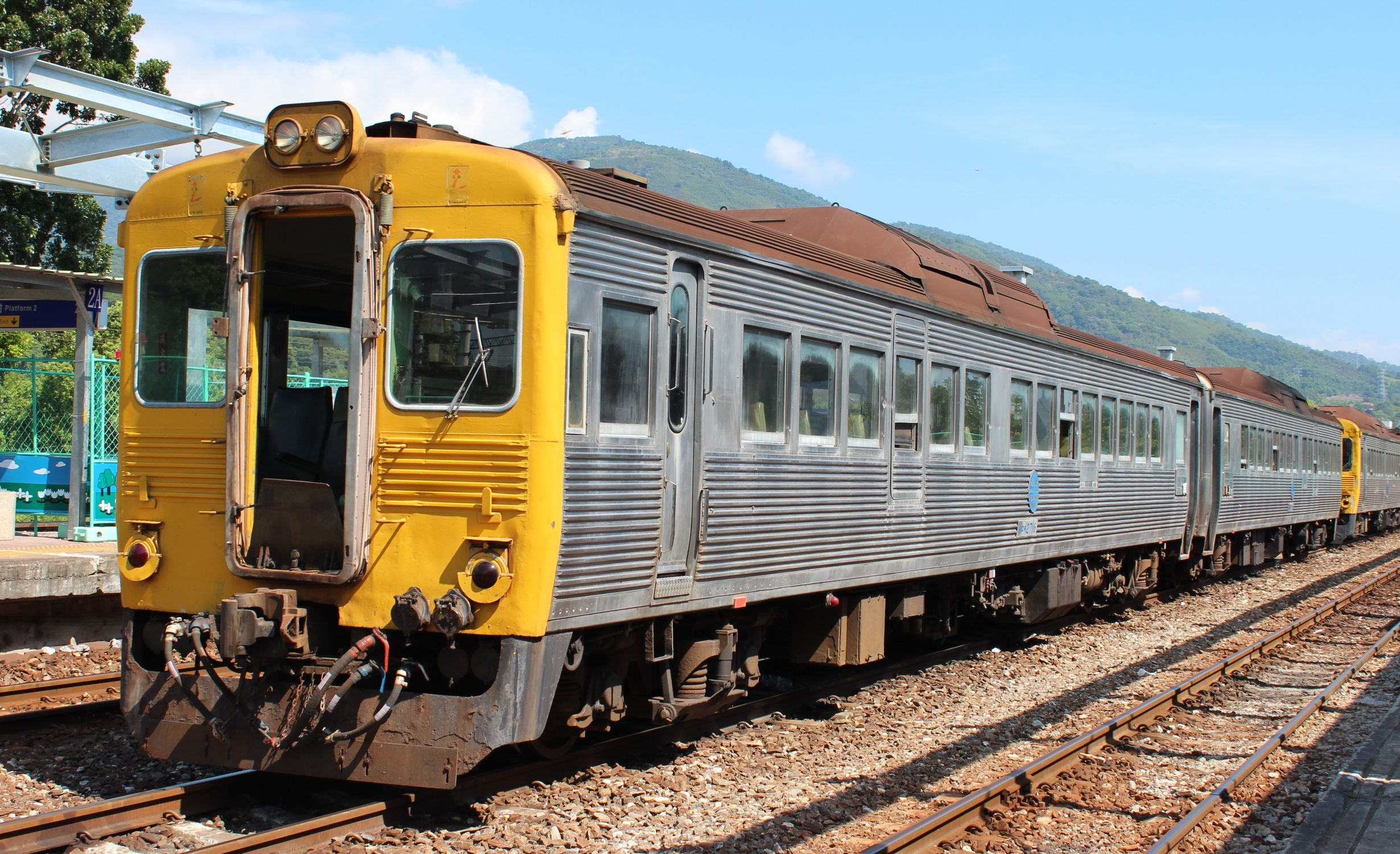
Taiwan DR 2700 DMU

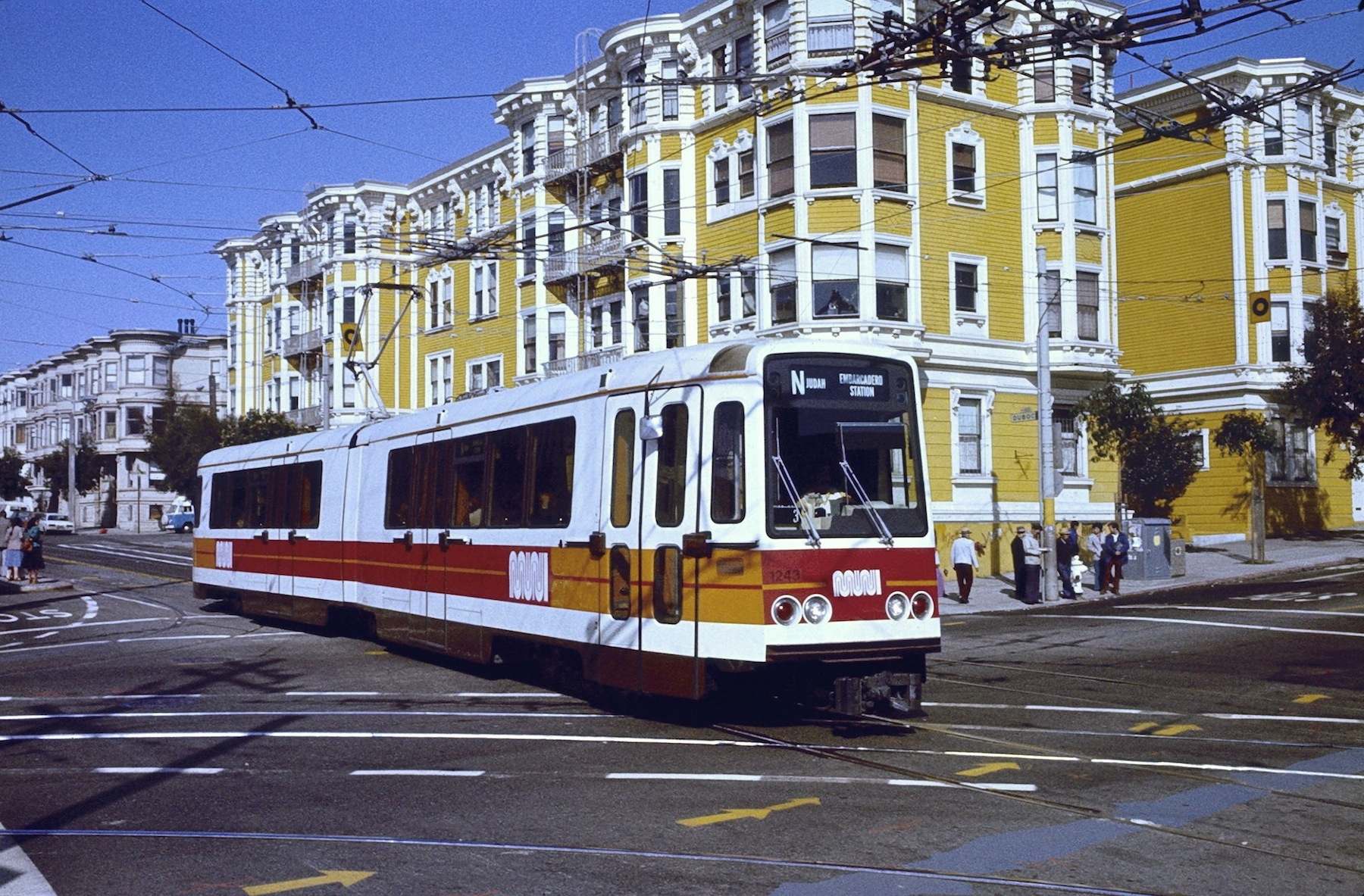
San Francisco Muni Metro

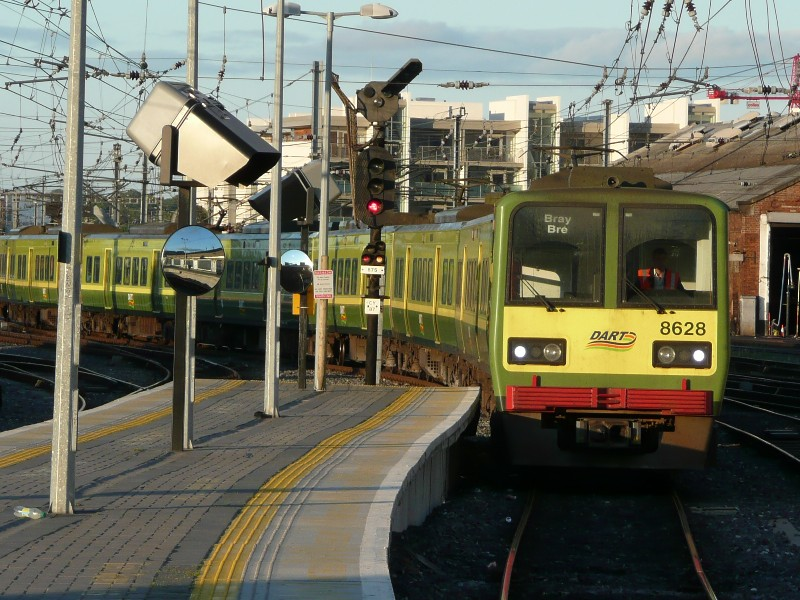
Ireland 8520 EMU

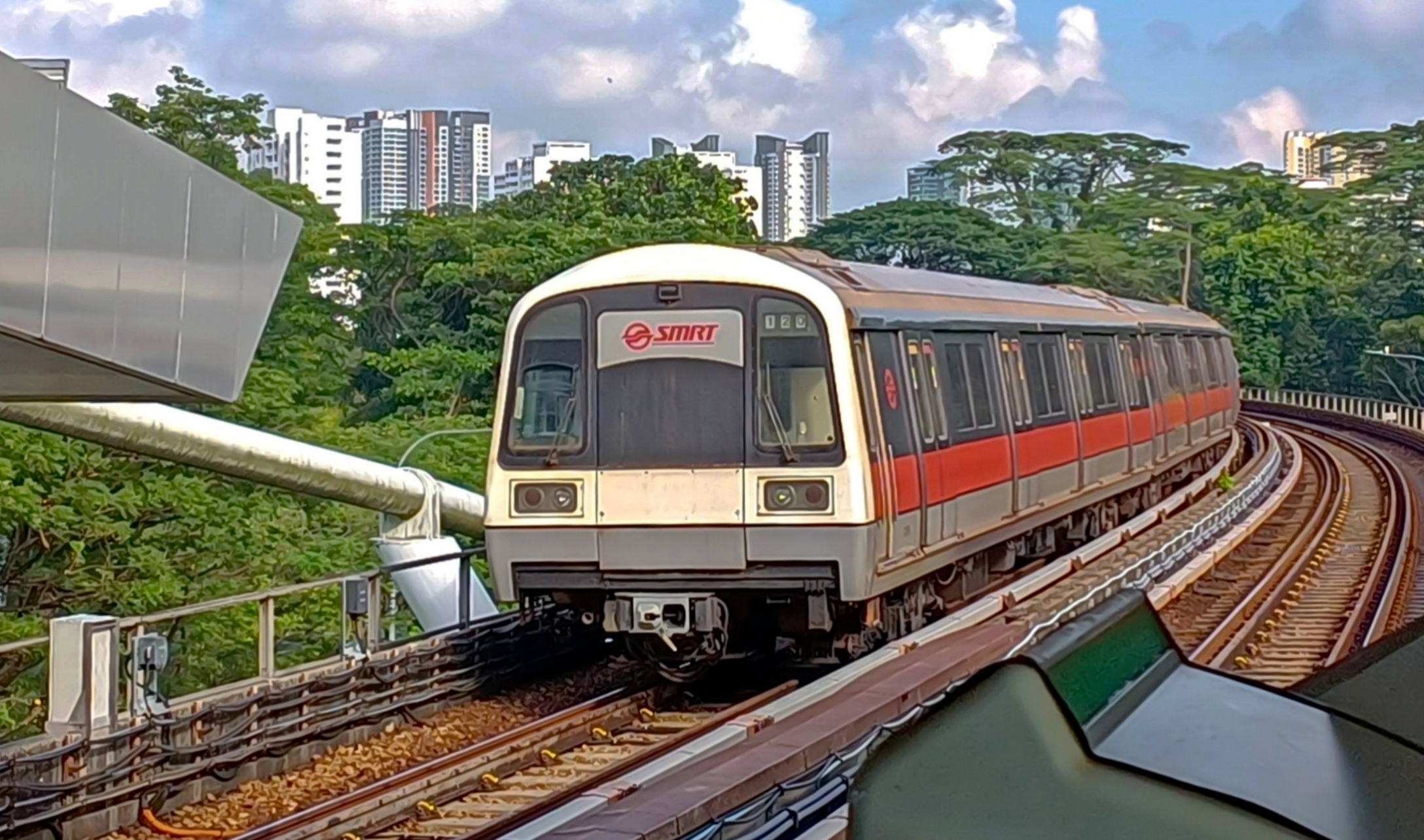
Singapore C151 train

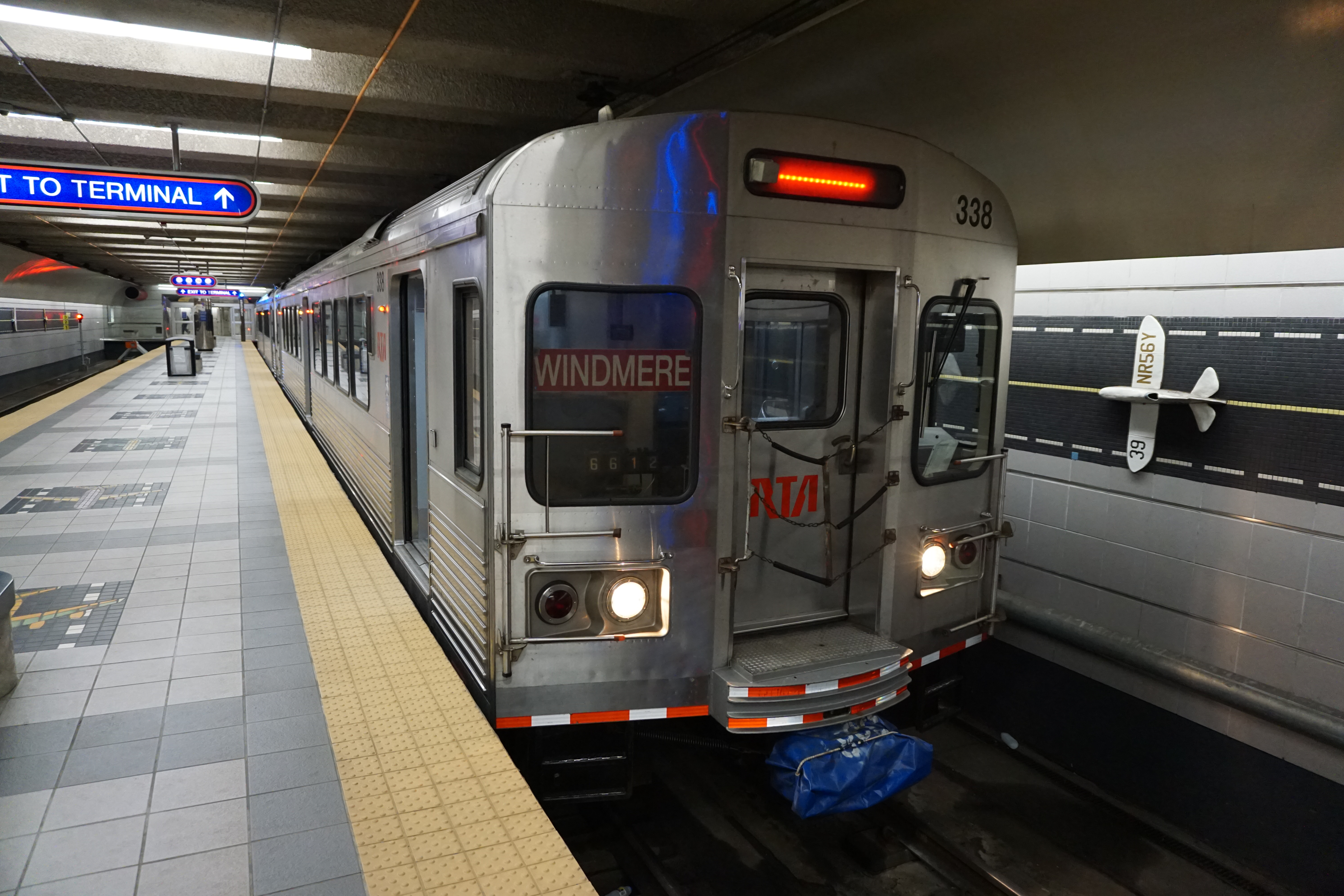
An RTA Red Line train at Cleveland Hopkins International Airport Station in Cleveland, Ohio (United States).

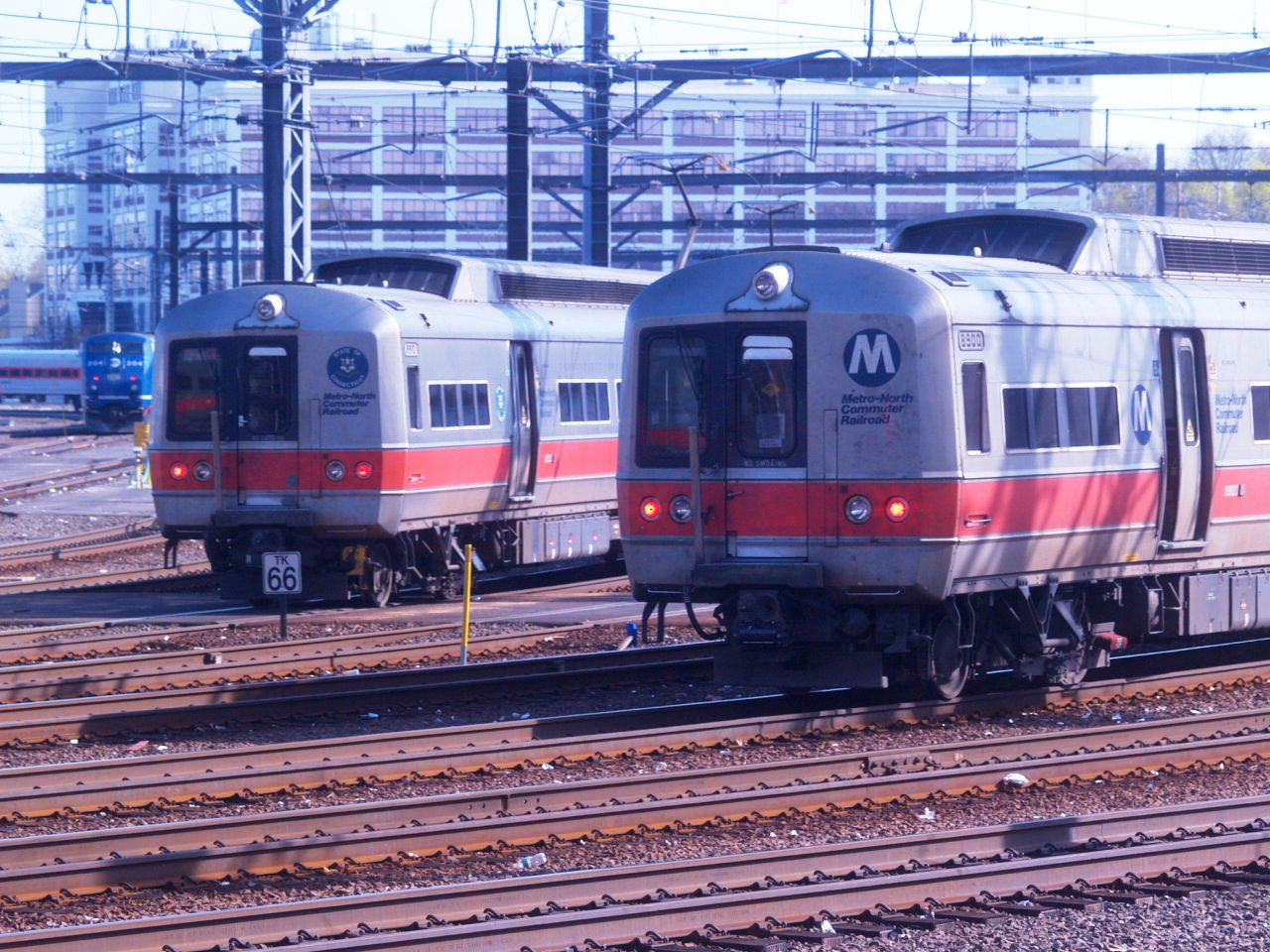
Metro North Railroad M4 series, USA

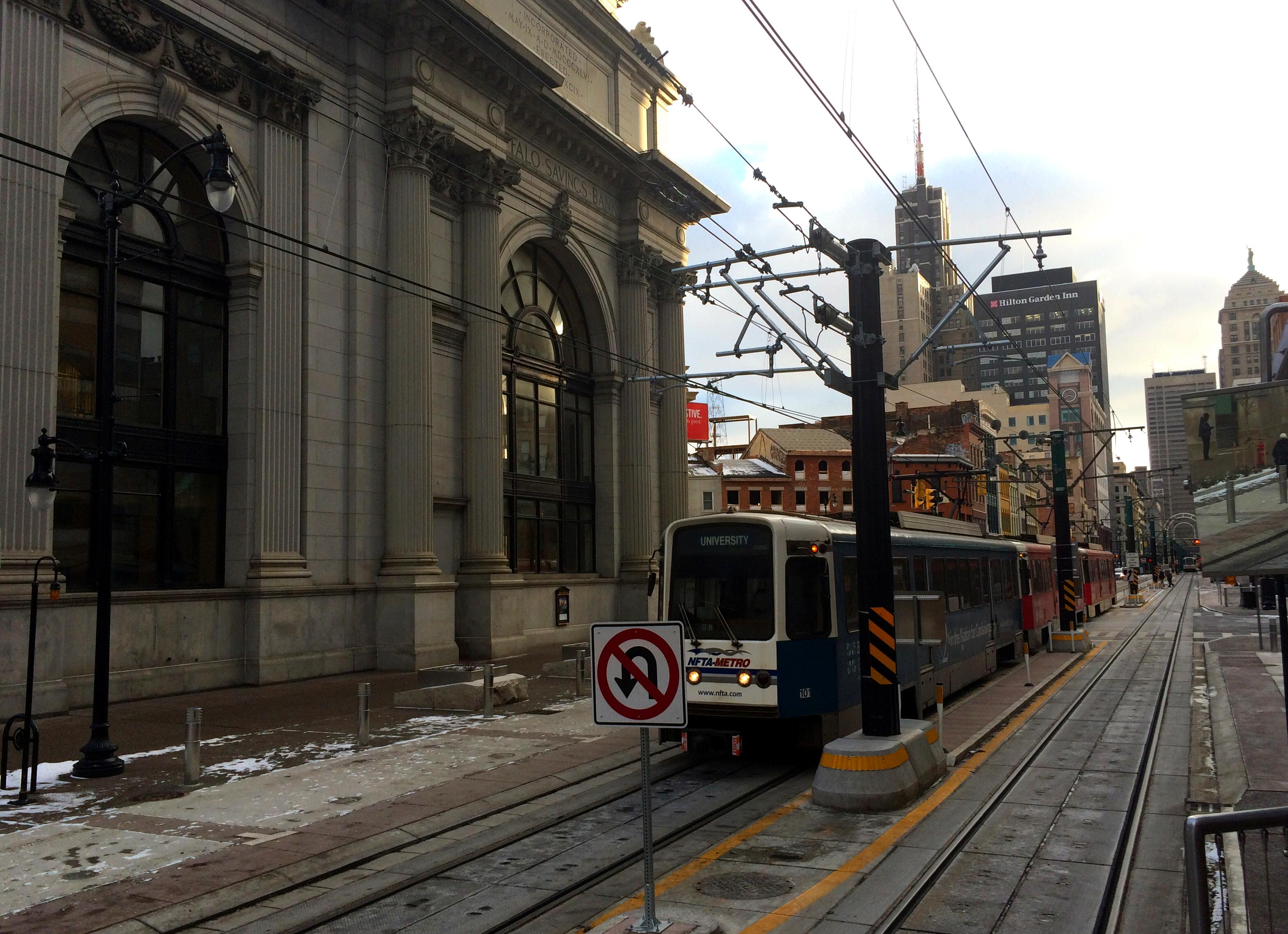
NFTA LRV in Buffalo, USA

=== As J-TREC ===
- JR East E235 and E353 series EMU rail cars
- Bangkok MRT Purple Line EMU cars
- Shizuoka Railway A3000 series EMU cars
- Toei 5500 series EMU cars
- Tokyu 2020, 3020 & 6020 Series EMU cars
- Philippine National Railways North–South Commuter Railway EM1000 class EMU cars, in a joint venture with Sumitomo Corporation
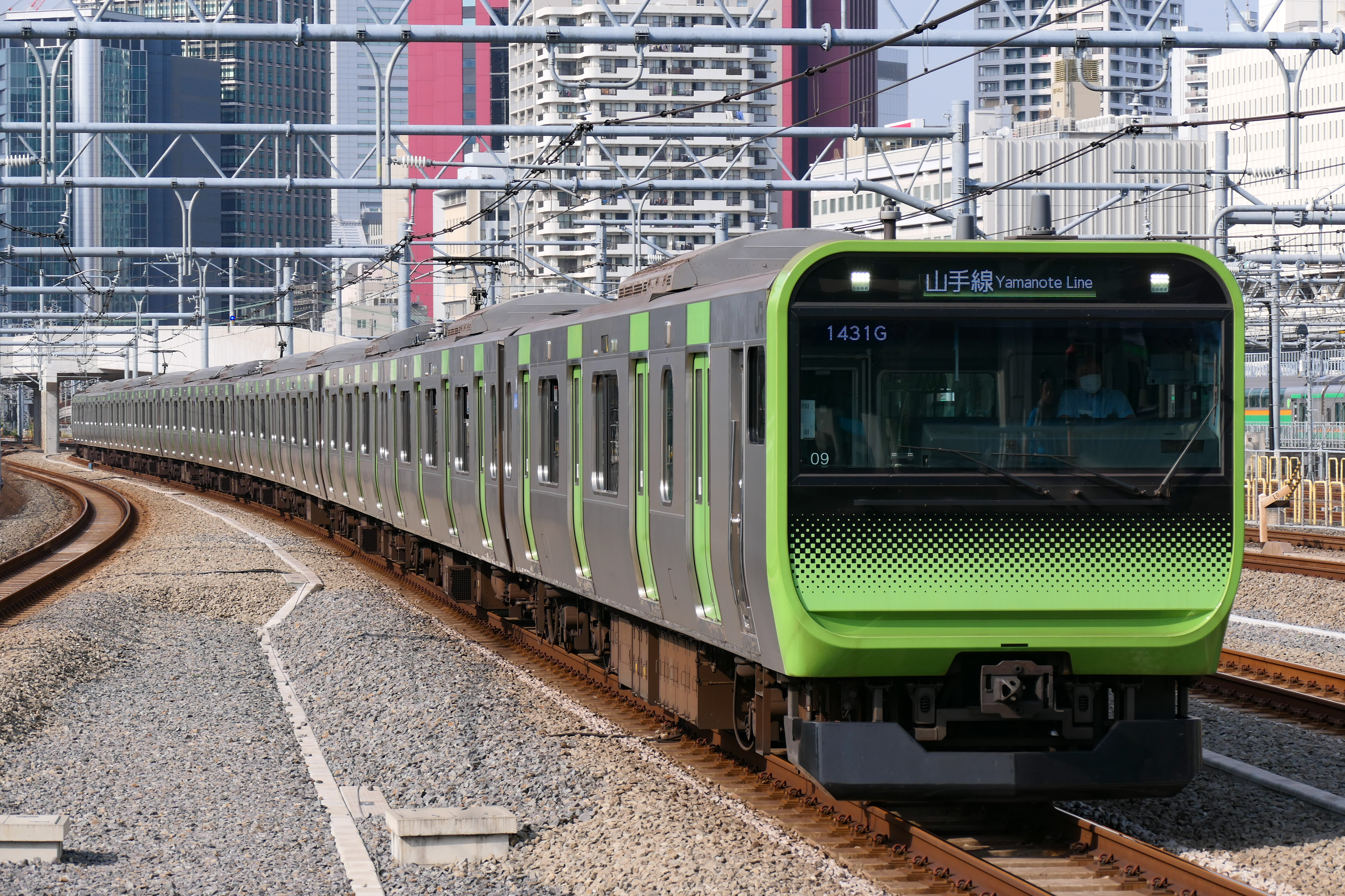
E235 series

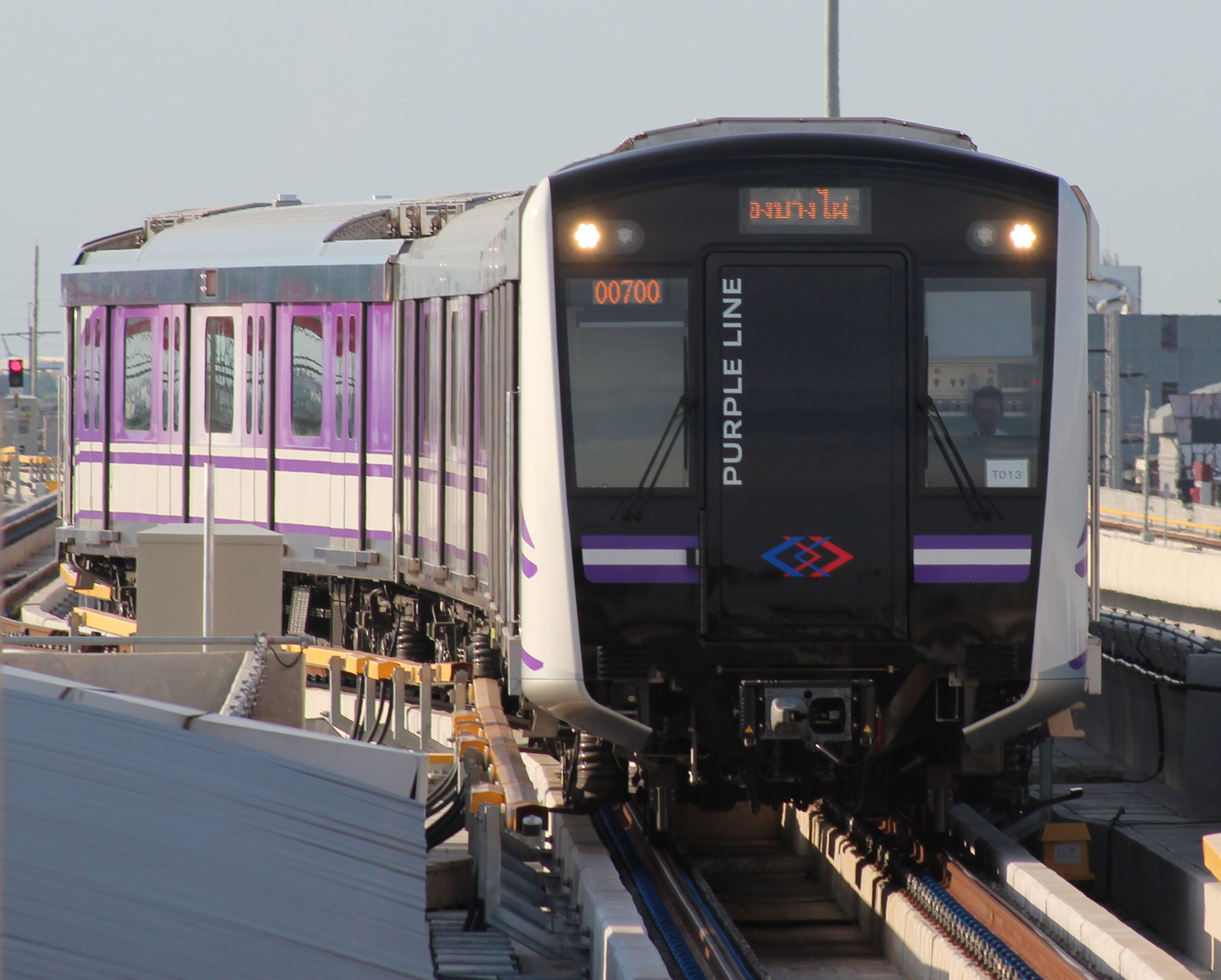
Bangkok Purple Line's sustina EMU cars

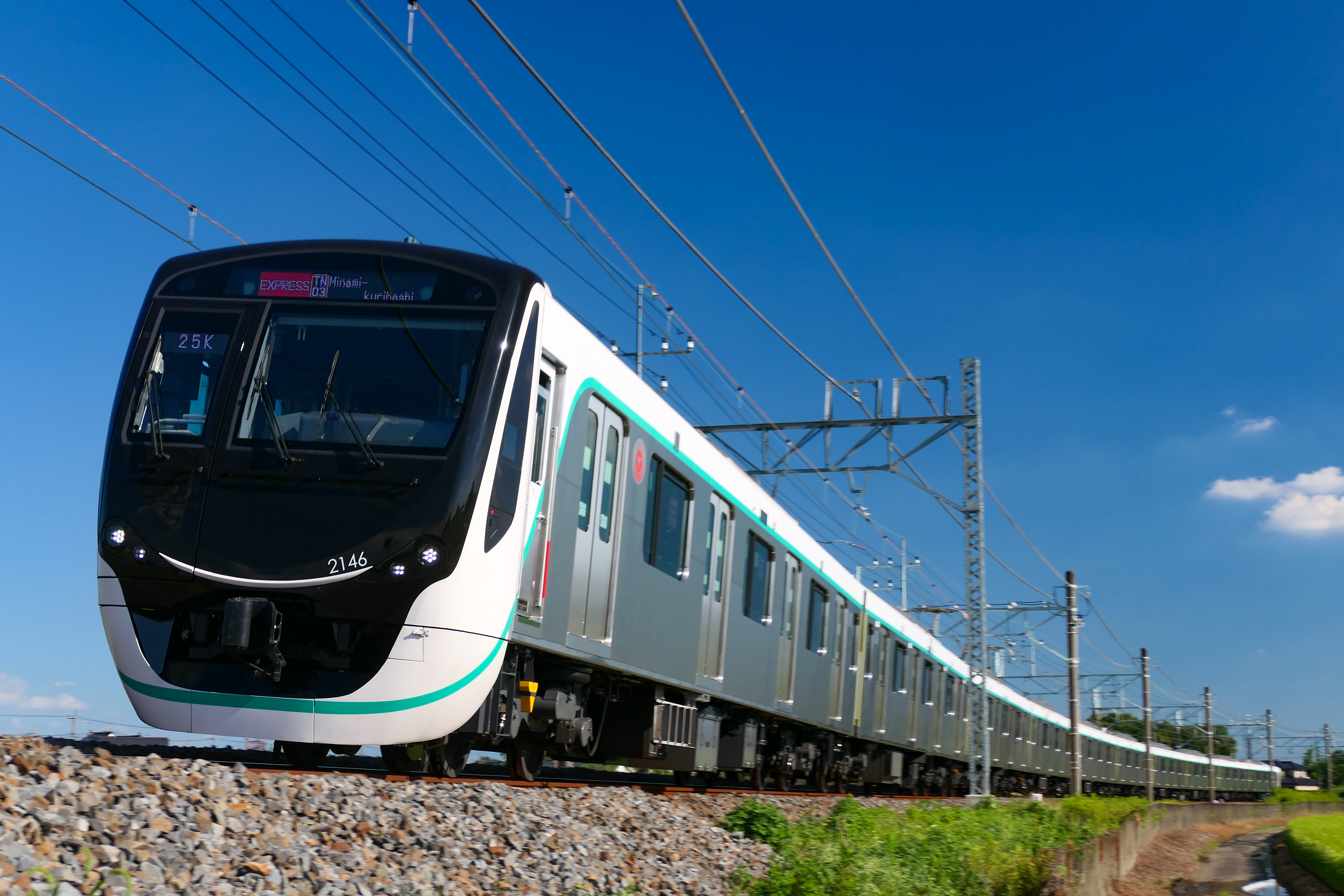
A Den-en-toshi Line 2020 series set in August 2021

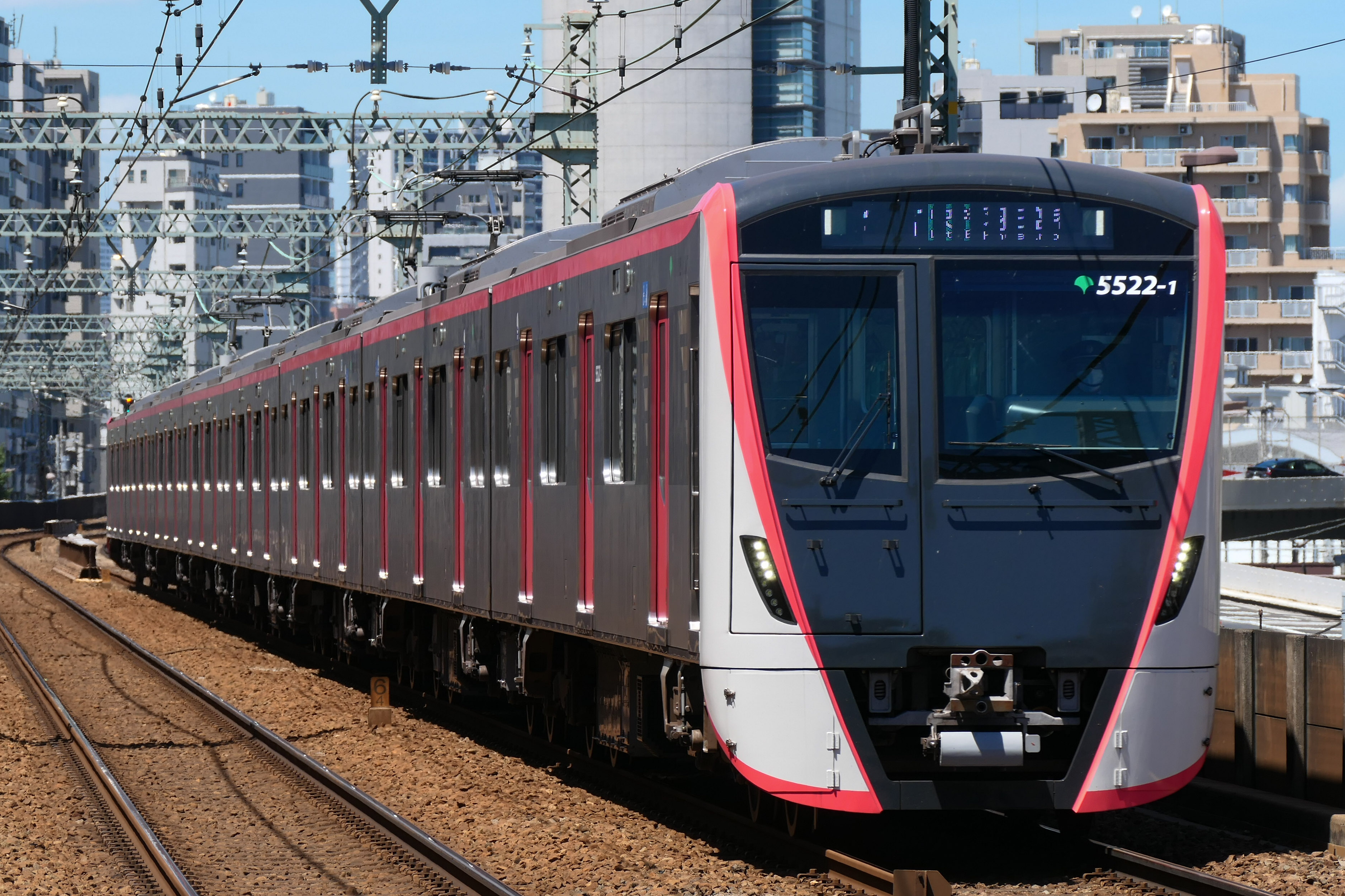
Toei 5500 Series In Toei Subway.

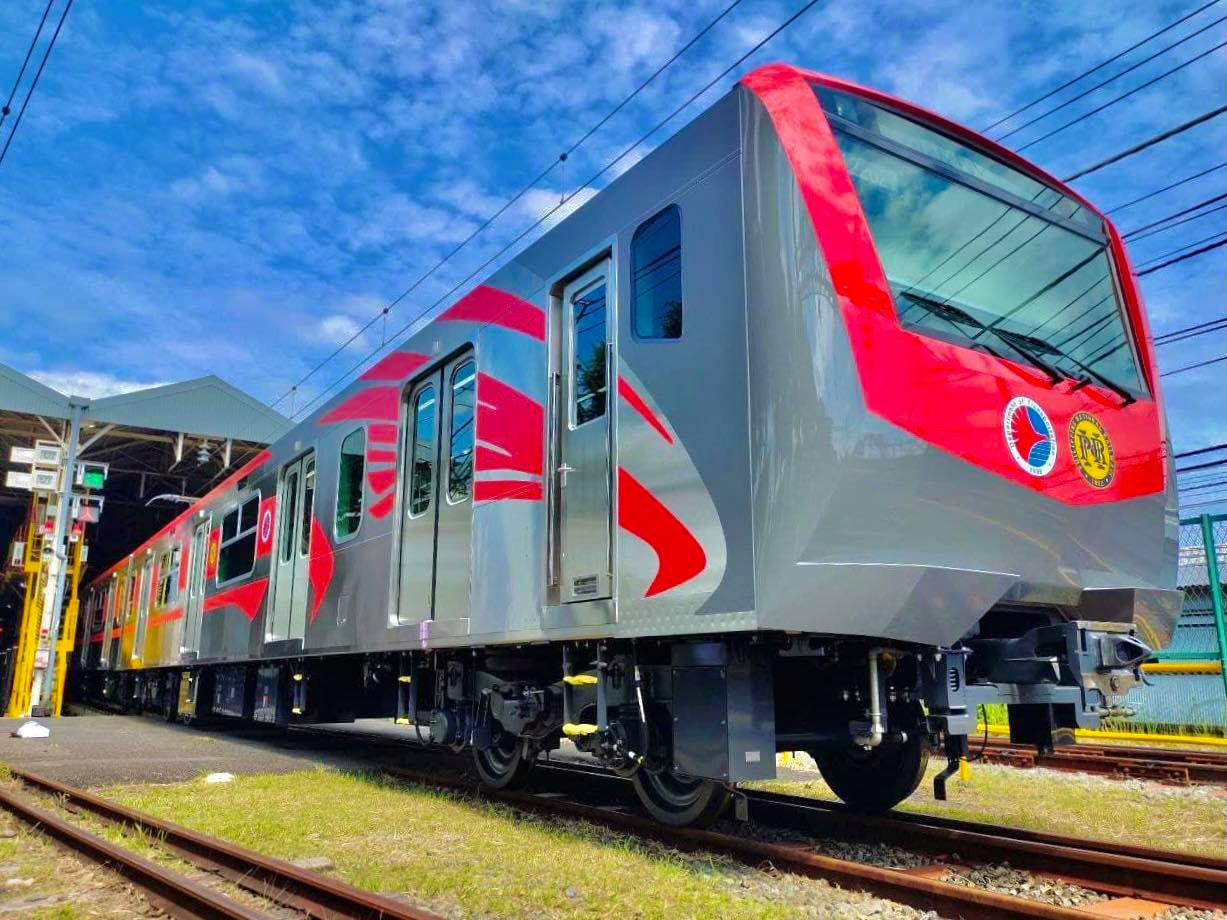
PNR EM10000 class in Yokohama, Japan

Collaborations:

- Collaborated with PT INKA for PT Kereta Api Indonesia KAI Commuter Bogor Line iE305 series (also known as CLI-225)
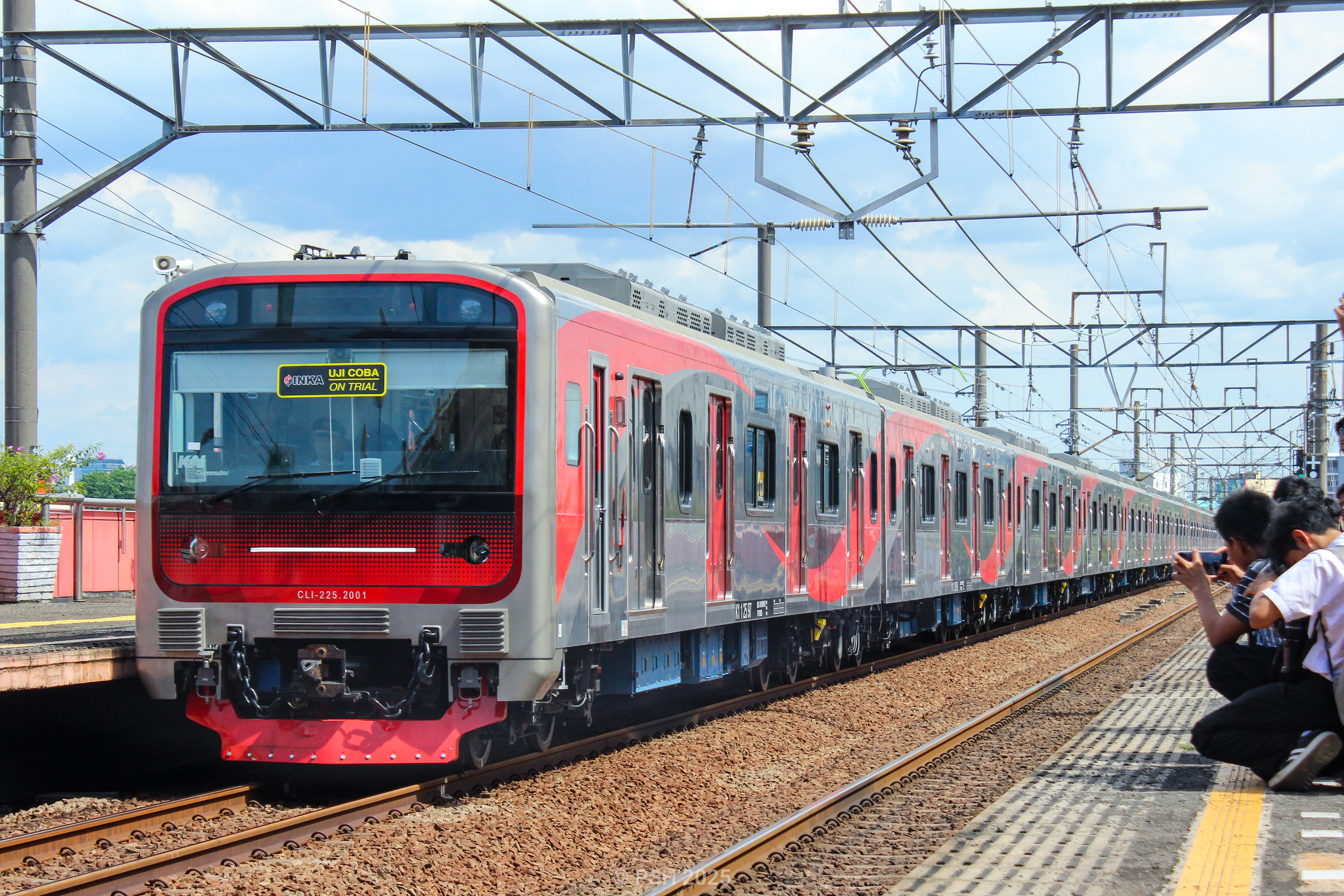
KRL INKA iE305 series on a test run in Jayakarta Station
