= John Tonkin (disambiguation) =

John Tonkin (1902–1995) was an Australian politician and the premier of Western Australia from 1971 to 1974.

John Tonkin may also refer to:

- John Tonkin (British Army officer) (1920–1995), member of the Special Air Service during the Second World War
- John Tonkin (New South Wales politician) (1889–1967), Australian politician and member of the New South Wales Legislative Council
