= Tonkin (disambiguation) =

Tonkin is an exonym for Northern Vietnam.

Tonkin may also refer to:

== Vietnam ==
- Đông Kinh, a former name of Hanoi, Vietnam
- the French protectorate of Tonkin, the northern part of French Indochina
- Gulf of Tonkin, a gulf in the South China Sea
- Gulf of Tonkin incident, a 1964 naval incident that precipitated the Gulf of Tonkin Resolution
- Gulf of Tonkin Resolution, the 1964 resolution of the US Congress that precipitated the buildup of US forces in Vietnam
- In France, the Sino-French War (1884–1885) is termed the Tonkin War.
- the Tonkin Affair, a political crisis in France

== Other ==
- Tonkin (surname)
- Tonkin Highway, a major arterial road in Perth, Western Australia
- Tonkin Railway in Switzerland
- Tonkin Street in Hong Kong
- Tonkinese cat, cat breed
- A type of Bamboo (Arundinaria amabilis or Pseudosasa amabilis).
- Tokyo
