= Tokio (given name) =

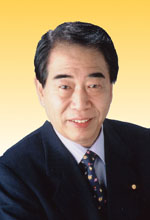
- Tokio Kano (1935–2017), Japanese politician
- Pronunciation: tokʲio (IPA)
- Gender: Male

Origin
- Origin: Japanese
- Meaning: Different meanings depending on the kanji used

Tokio is a masculine Japanese given name.

== Written forms ==
Tokio can be written using different combinations of kanji characters. Some examples:

- 時雄, "hour, masculine"
- 時男, "hour, man"
- 時夫, "hour, husband"
- 刻雄, "engrave, masculine"
- 刻男, "engrave, man"
- 刻夫, "engrave, husband"
- 晨雄, "morning, masculine"
- 期雄, "period, masculine"
- 登喜夫, "climb up, rejoice, husband"
- 登紀夫, "climb up, chronicle, husband"

The name can also be written in hiragana ときお or katakana トキオ.

== Notable people with the name ==
- Tokio Fukuda (福田 時雄; 1915–2001), Japanese hurdler
- Tokio Hatamoto (畑本 時央; born 1992), Japanese footballer
- Tokio Kano (加納 時男; 1935–2017), Japanese politician
- Tokio Sato (佐藤 常貴雄; born 1942), Japanese cross-country skier
- Tokio Seki (関 時男; born 1944), Japanese actor and voice actor
- Tokio Takeuchi (竹内 時男; 1894–1944), Japanese physicist
- Tokio Tasaka (田阪 登紀夫; born 1947), Japanese table tennis player
