= Dongjing =

Dongjing may refer to:

== Eastern Capital (東京) ==
- Luoyang, the eastern capital of the Sui and Tang dynasties
- Kaifeng, the eastern and main capital of the Northern Song dynasty
- Liaoyang, the eastern capital of the Jurchen Jin dynasty
- Shangjing Longquanfu, or Dongjing
- Tokyo, the capital of Japan
- Hanoi, the capital of Vietnam

== Other uses ==
- Dongjing, Changsha (洞井街道), a subdistrict of Yuhua District, Changsha, Hunan province
  - Dongjing railway station (洞井站), on Changsha-Zhuzhou-Xiangtan intercity railway
- Dongjing, Shanghai (洞泾镇), a town of Songjiang District, Shanghai
  - Dongjing Station (洞泾站), on Shanghai Metro Line 9
- Dongjing (music) (洞经音乐), Chinese ritual music

== See also ==
- Dongjin (disambiguation)
- 東京 (disambiguation) (in Japanese and Vietnamese)
