= Tokyo (disambiguation) =

The Tokyo Metropolis or Tokyo (東京, Tōkyō) is the capital of Japan.

Tokyo may also refer to:

== Places ==
- Edo, former name of Tokyo until 1868
- Tokyo Prefecture, former Japanese prefecture from 1868 to 1943 that preceded the Tokyo Metropolis
  - Tokyo City, former city within Tokyo Prefecture from 1889 to 1943
- Special wards of Tokyo, 23 wards that cover the urban portion of Tokyo
- Greater Tokyo Area, metropolitan area that covers Tokyo and the surrounding region

== People ==
- Tokyo Sexwale, South African businessman and former politician

== Films ==
- Tokyo-Ga, a 1985 film by Wim Wenders
- Tokyo!, a 2008 film by Michel Gondry, Leos Carax, and Bong Joon-ho

== Literature ==
- Tokyo: A View of the City, a 1999 book by Donald Richie
- Tokyo, a 2004 crime novel by British author Mo Hayder

== Music ==
- List of songs about Tokyo
- Specific songs so titled:
  - "Tokyo" (Hans Vandenburg song), 1995
  - "Tokyo" (Masaharu Fukuyama song), 2005
  - "Tokyo" (Yui song), 2006
  - Tokyo (Danny Saucedo song), 2007
  - "Tokyo" (Owl City song), 2014
  - "Tokyo" (Juju song), 2018
  - "Tokyo" (White Lies song), 2019
  - "Tokyo", by Dollar from Shooting Stars, 1979
  - "Tokyo", song on album A Flock of Seagulls, 1982
  - "Tokyo", song by The Adicts, 1984
  - "Tokyo", by Eikichi Yazawa, 1993
  - "Tokyo", by The Books, from album The Lemon of Pink, 2003
  - "Tokyo", by Athlete from the album Beyond the Neighbourhood, 2007
  - "Tokyo", by Imagine Dragons, from EP It's Time, 2011
  - "Tokyo", by BT on album _, 2016
  - "Tokyo", by Brockhampton from Saturation II, 2017
  - "Tokyo", by Joan, 2018
  - "Tokyo", by RM (rapper) on mixtape Mono, 2018
  - "Tokyo", by Alexandra Stan on album Rainbows, 2022
  - "Tokyo", performed by Yashiki Takajin

== Other uses ==
- 498 Tokio, asteroid named after the city
- Tokyo, beer brand from Scottish brewers BrewDog
- Tokyō, bracketing system used in Japanese architecture
- Tokyo, fictional character from the television series Money Heist
- Tokyo Verdy, Japanese professional football club

== See also ==
- Tokio (disambiguation)
- Tokyo Tokyo, a restaurant chain in the Philippines
- Tokyu (disambiguation)
- 東京 (disambiguation)
