= S. canina =

S. canina may refer to:

- Scrophularia canina, a plant species in the genus Scrophularia
- Snyderidia canina, a fish species in the genus Snyderidia

== See also ==
- Canina (disambiguation)
