= 9K =

9K may refer to:

- 9000 (number), the natural number following 8999 and preceding 9001
- Gnome-Rhône 9K, a 9-cylinder 550 hp (405 kW) air-cooled radial engine
- Cape Air IATA airline designator
- Kuwait aircraft registration code
- Kampfgeschwader 51, from its historic Geschwaderkennung code with the Luftwaffe in World War II
- NY 9K, see New York State Route 9N
- Soyuz 9K, see Soyuz-B
- Yak 9K, see Yakovlev Yak-9
- 9K, a model of SNECMA Atar
- Typ 9K, a model of SEAT Inca
- GCR Class 9K, a class of British 4-4-2T steam locomotive

== See also ==
- 9000 (disambiguation)
- K9 (disambiguation)
- K (disambiguation)
