= K9 =

K9 or K-9 most commonly refers to:

- K9, the nickname of police dogs and the police dog unit itself
- Canine or Canis, a genus including dogs, wolves, coyotes, and jackals

K9 or K-9 may also refer to:

== Fictional dogs ==
- K9 (Doctor Who), the name of several robotic canines in the British science fiction television series Doctor Who
- K-9 (Looney Tunes), a dog in the Looney Tunes cartoon series
- K9 Murphy, a mechanical dog in the Japanese television series Tokusou Sentai Dekaranger

== Computing ==
- AMD K9, a microprocessor
- K-9 Mail, a mail client for the Android operating system
- K9 Web Protection, a web content control software
- K9Copy, a DVD backup and authoring program for Unix-like operating systems

== Entertainment ==
- K-9 (film), a 1989 American film
  - K-9 (film series), a film series consisting of four movies
- K-9 (TV series) a British/Australian comedy/adventure series starring the same character as featured in Doctor Who
- K-9 and Company earlier British pilot for a potential adventure series, also starring the character from Doctor Who.
- K9, a television station serving Boise, Idaho, now known as KNIN-TV
- Sonata in G for Keyboard and Violin, K. 9, a sonata by Wolfgang Amadeus Mozart
- K-9: Public Security Bureau, Division 9 (Manga series), written and illustrated by Tetsuya Okuyama.

== Military ==
- HMAS K9, an Australian submarine
- K-9 (missile), a Soviet short-range air-to-air missile
- Kahr K9, a variant of the Kahr K series, a 9×19mm Parabellum semi-automatic pistol manufactured by the American company Kahr Arms
- K9 Thunder, a 155 mm self-propelled artillery used by the Republic of Korea Armed Forces
- Pusan East (K-9) Air Base, an abandoned air base in Busan, South Korea

== Automotive ==
- Kia K9, a full-size luxury sedan
- K-9 (Kansas highway), a state highway in Kansas, US
- BYD K9, a battery electric bus

== Other ==
- K9 glass, an inexpensive variety of crown glass
- K9, a children's shoe size
- Kalitta Charters, IATA airline code
- Kenneth Walker III (born 2000), American football running back whose nickname is "K9"

== See also ==
- Canine (disambiguation)
- Kanine (disambiguation)
- 9K (disambiguation)
