= Odakyu 8000 series =

Electric multiple unit of Odakyu Electric Railway

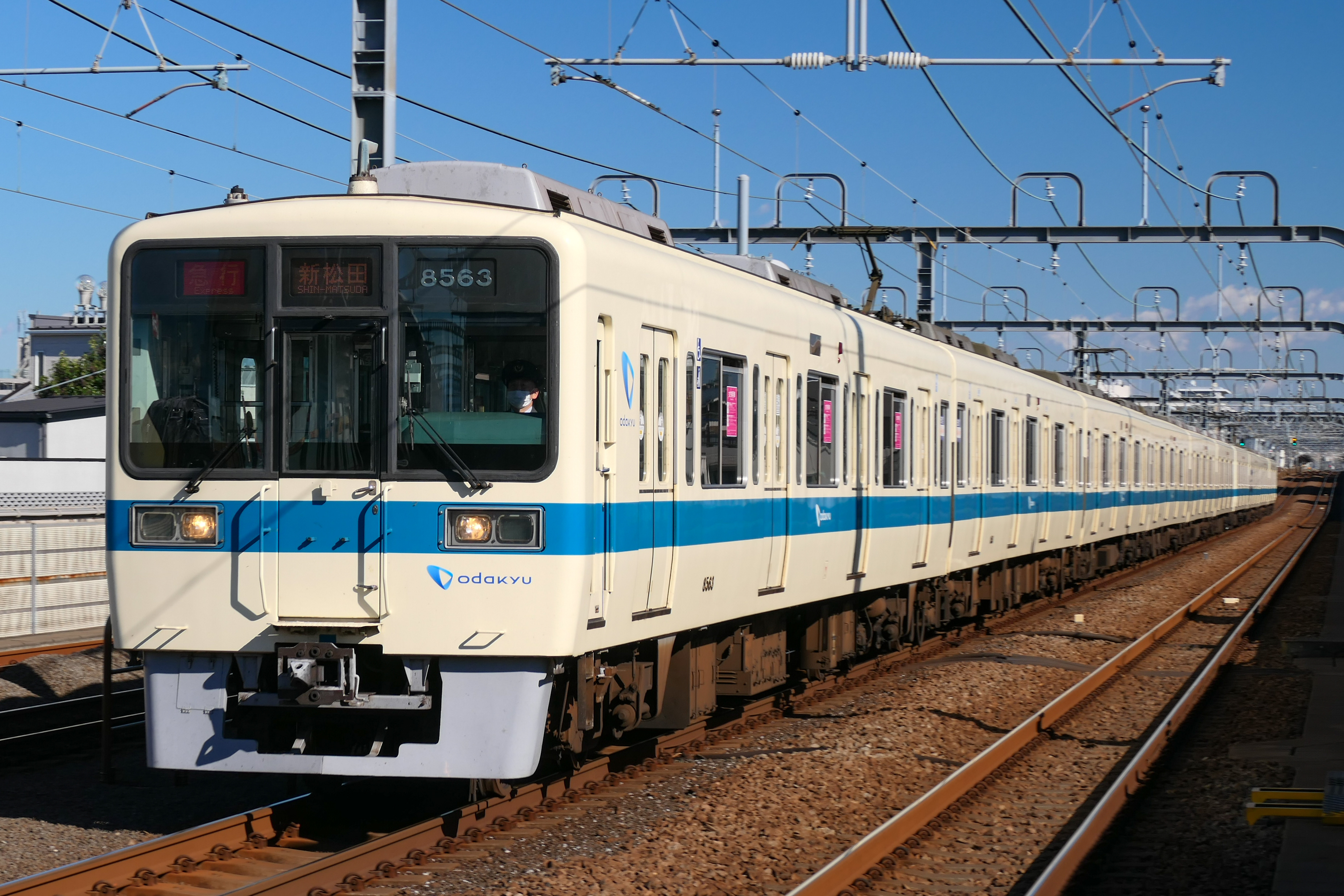
- 6-car set 8263 in November 2021
- In service: 1983 – Present
- Manufacturers: Nippon Sharyo, Kawasaki Heavy Industries, Tokyu Car Corporation
- Constructed: 1982–1987
- Entered service: 22 March 1983
- Refurbished: 2002–2013
- Scrapped: 2020–
- Number built: 160 vehicles (32 sets)
- Number in service: 148 vehicles (30 sets)
- Number scrapped: 12 vehicles
- Formation: 4 or 6 cars per trainset
- Fleet numbers: 8051–8066, 8251–8266
- Operator: Odakyu
- Depot: Kitami
- Lines served: Odakyū Odawara Line; Odakyū Enoshima Line; Odakyū Tama Line

Specifications
- Car body construction: Steel
- Car length: 20,000 mm (65 ft 7 in)
- Width: 2,900 mm (9 ft 6 in)
- Height: 4,145 mm (13 ft 7 in)
- Doors: 4 pairs per side
- Maximum speed: Service: 100 km/h (62 mph); Design: 110 km/h (68 mph)
- Traction system: As built: GTO chopper; Retrofitted: Variable frequency (IGBT)
- Power output: 140 kW x4 per motored car (field chopper sets); 190 kW x4 per motored car (VVVF sets)
- Acceleration: 3 km/(h⋅s) (1.9 mph/s) (field chopper sets); 3.3 km/(h⋅s) (2.1 mph/s) (VVVF sets)
- Deceleration: 3.5 km/(h⋅s) (2.2 mph/s) (field chopper sets); 4 km/(h⋅s) (2.5 mph/s) (VVVF sets)
- Electric system: 1,500 V DC
- Current collection: Overhead lines
- Bogies: FS516 (powered cars); FS016 (non-powered cars)
- Braking system: Regenerative braking
- Safety systems: OM-ATS, D-ATS-P
- Multiple working: 4000I/5000I/9000/1000/3000 series
- Track gauge: 1,067 mm (3 ft 6 in)

The Odakyu 8000 series (小田急8000形, Odakyū 8000-gata) is a commuter electric multiple unit (EMU) train type operated by the private railway operator Odakyu Electric Railway in Japan since 1983.

== Formation ==
Trains are formed as 6- and 4-car sets as shown below, with car 1/7 facing the Odawara, Fujisawa or Karakida end and car 6/10 facing the Shinjuku or Katase-Enoshima end. Trains are mostly used in 6+4 car formations.

=== 6-car sets ===
Car No.	1	2	3	4	5	6
Designation	Tc2	M3	T1	M2	M1	Tc1
Numbering	8550	8500	8450	8300	8200	8250
Capacity	144	162	162	162	162	144
Weight (t)	31.2	39.8	33.3	40.3	39.3	31.7

The M3 and M2 cars each have two single-arm pantographs.

=== 4-car sets ===
Car No.	7	8	9	10
Designation	Tc2	M2	M1	Tc1
Numbering	8150	8100	8000	8050
Capacity	144	162	162	144
Weight (t)	31.3	40.5	39.2	34.1

The M1 and M2 cars each have one single-arm pantograph.

== Interior ==
Passenger accommodation consists of seven-person bench seating situated between the doors with blue upholstery, with smaller bench seats that hold up to four at the car ends. Trains refurbished in 2007 have an interior that is similar to that of the 4000 series. Some cars have a jump seat that folds up to provide space for commuters using wheelchairs.

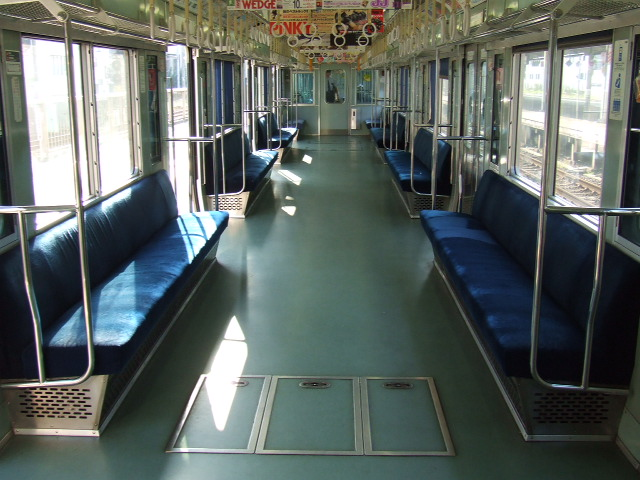
Interior of an unrefurbished 8000 series car

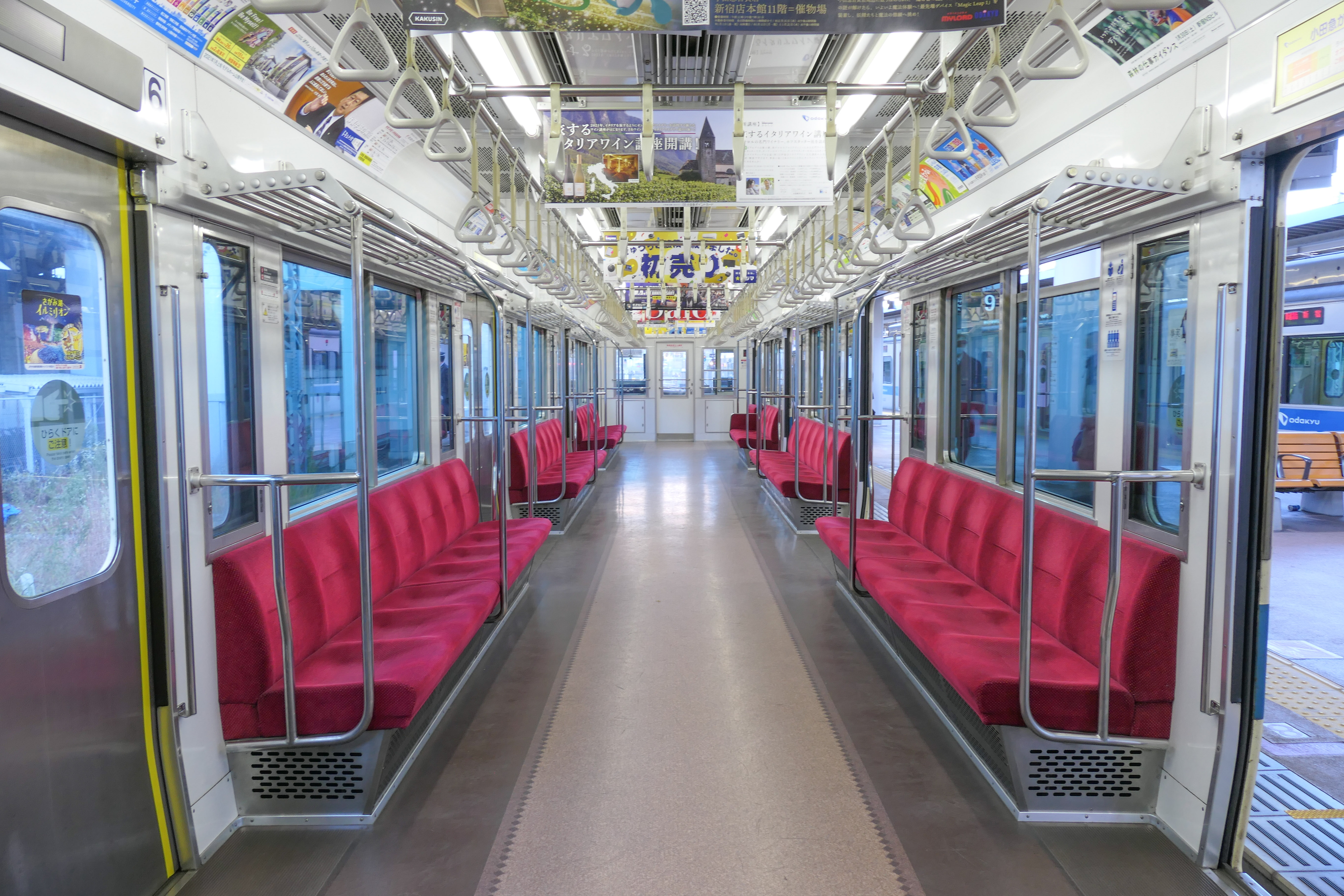
Interior of a refurbished 8000 series car, December 2020

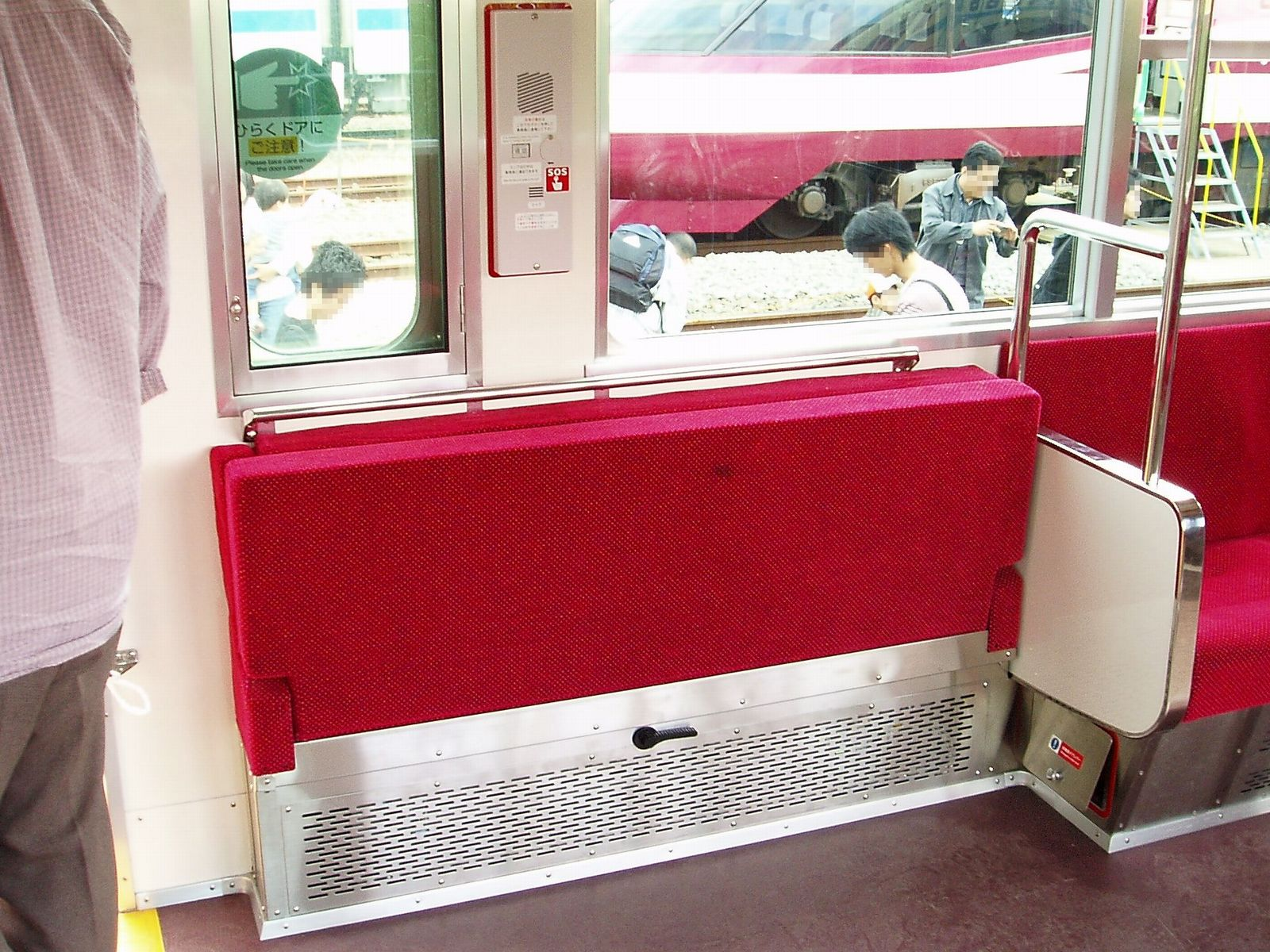
Jump seat in car 8263

== History ==
Built from 1982, the 8000 series was designed to help the Odakyu Electric Railway deal with the increasing number of passengers they had to carry from suburbs into the Tokyo region. The 8000 series was the last Odakyu trainset to use their distinctive ivory body with blue accents; all future Odakyu commuter trains would use unpainted stainless steel bodies with the same blue accents.

Starting from 2002, the 8000 series would undergo a program of refurbishment. Improvements include replacement of LED screens, new variable-frequency drive systems and replacement of the lozenge-style pantographs to single-arm pantographs among others.

Set 8255, one of the last two remaining field chopper sets, was withdrawn from service in August 2020. It was carried out of Sagami-Ōno depot to a scrapping facility on 27 October 2020.

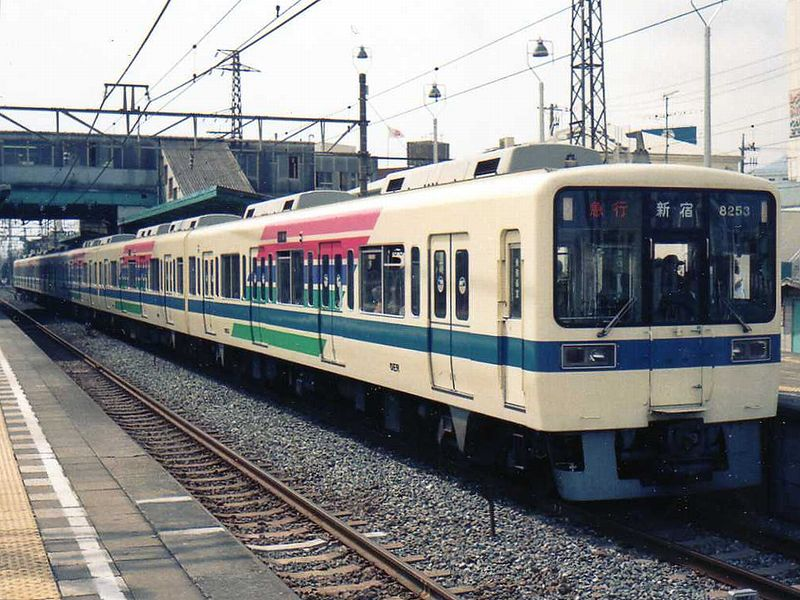
OER set 8253 in 1987

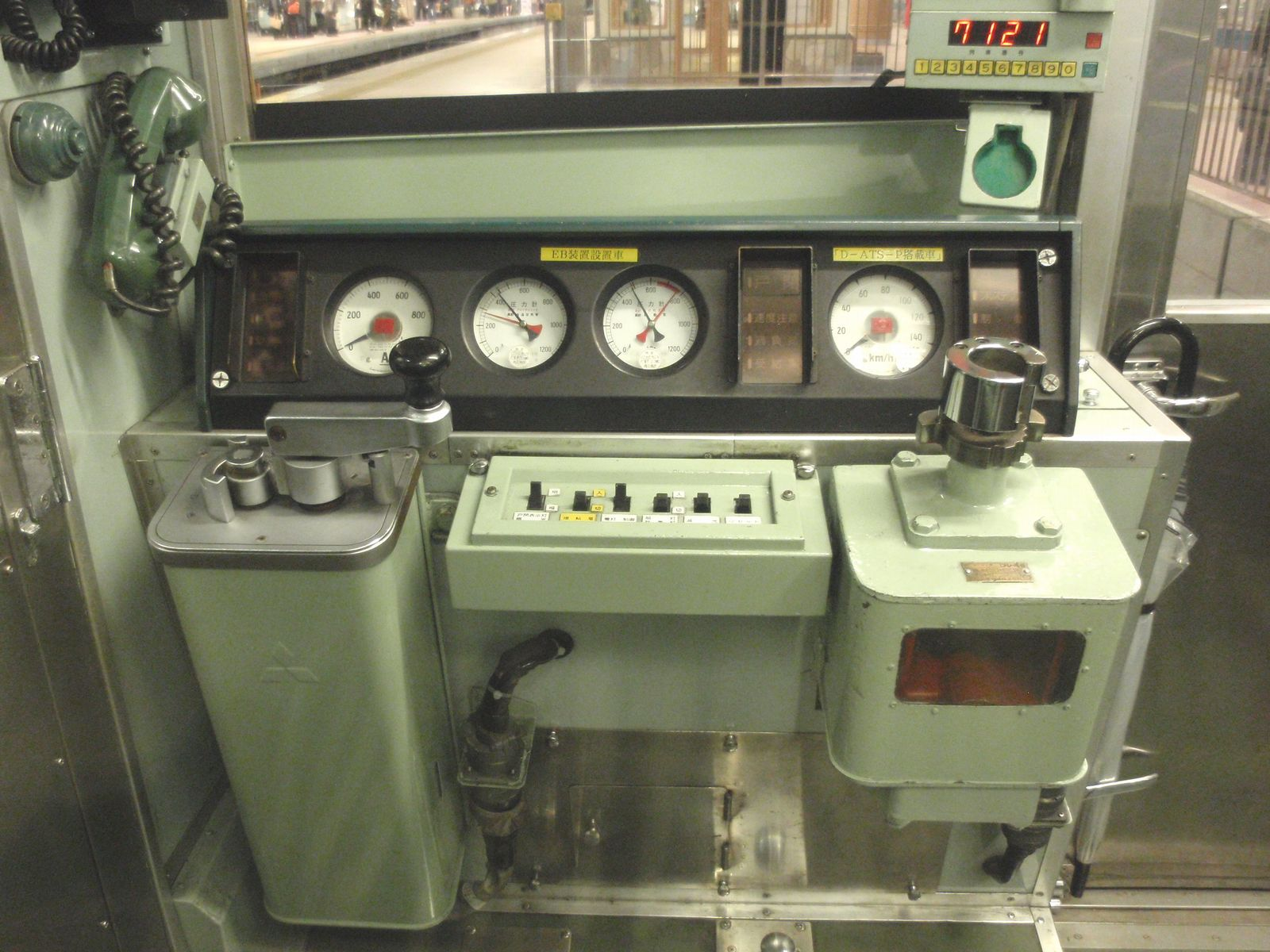
Unrefurbished driving cab

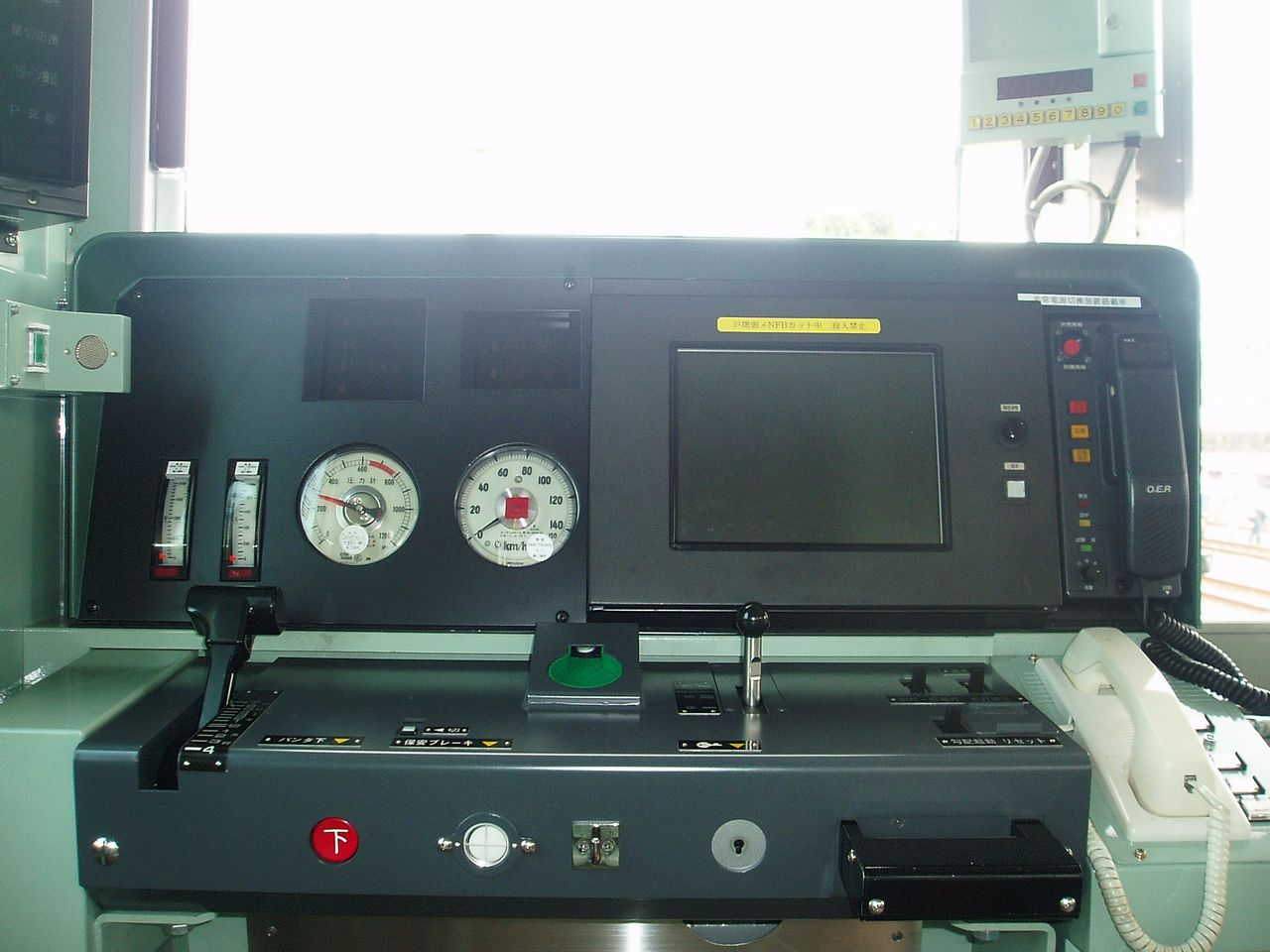
Refurbished driving cab

=== Transfer to Seibu Railway ===
On 26 September 2023, it was announced that Odakyu Railway would be transferring over a number of 8000 series trainsets to the Seibu Railway along with some Tokyu 9000 series trainsets from Tokyu Railway. The transfer is set to take place over five years from 2024 to 2029. Seibu announced that 8000 series sets will be used on the Kokubunji Line. It was later announced on 10 May 2024 that one 8000 series set would be transferred to Seibu Railway and enter service on the Kokubunji Line later in 2024 as part of its fiscal 2024 capital investment plan. The first set to be transferred, 6-car set 8261, was transported from Shin-Matsuda Station to Seibu's Kotesashi Depot via Kawasaki Freight Station on 19 and 20 May 2024.

The transferred fleet, reclassified Seibu 8000 series (西武8000系), entered service with Seibu on 31 May 2025.

== Accidents and incidents ==
On 12 August 2013 at about 6:35pm JST, 8000 series set 8261 (operated with set 8058) was struck by lightning. No passengers were hurt as the train was equipped with lightning arresters; however, as a result of the strike, the train was left stalled for about twenty minutes and needed repairs.

On 19 June 2019, set 8264 (operated with set 8064) was severely damaged in a collision with a car stuck at a level crossing between Hon-Atsugi and Aikōishida. Set 8264 was scrapped on 1 April the following year.

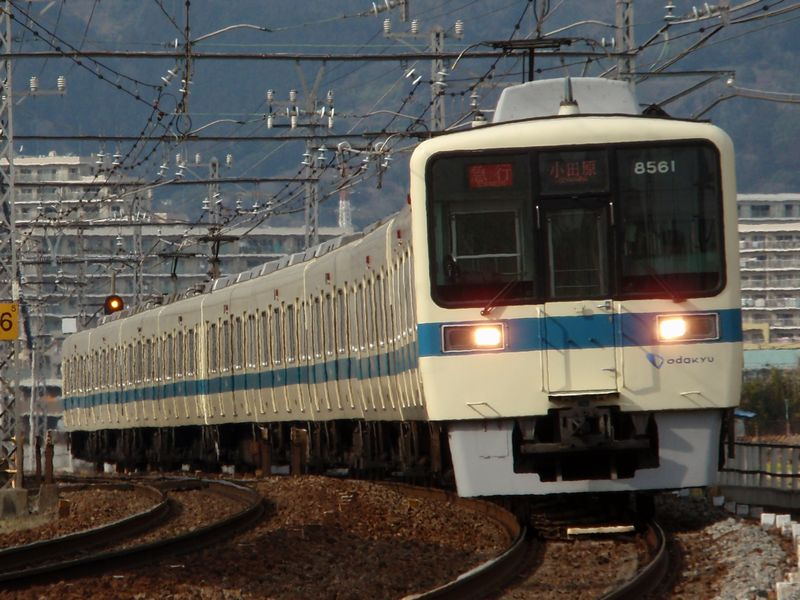
8261, the set involved in the lightning-strike incident, in 2012
