= Odakyu 9000 series =

Japanese train type

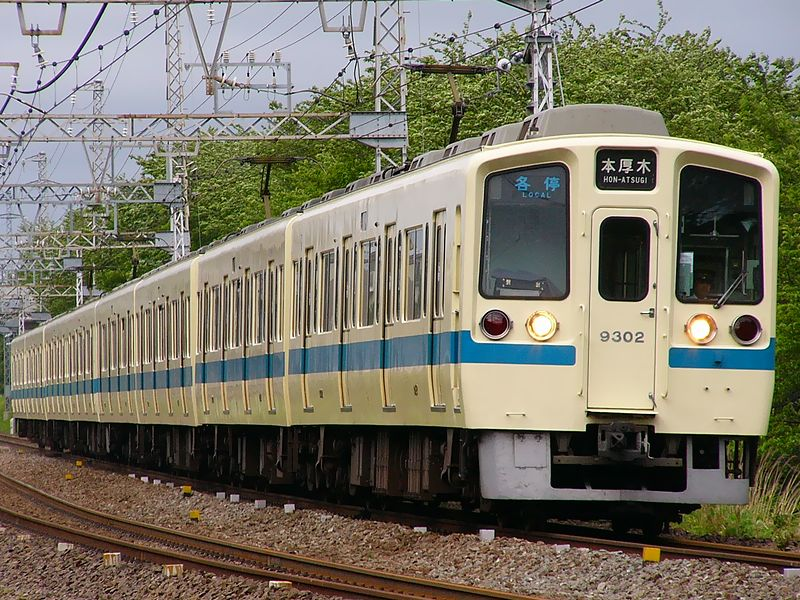
- A 9000 series train in May 2004
- In service: 1972–2006
- Manufacturer: Tokyu Car, Kawasaki Heavy Industries
- Constructed: 1972–1977
- Scrapped: 2005–2006
- Number built: 90 vehicles (18 sets)
- Number in service: None
- Number preserved: 1 vehicle
- Formation: 4/6 cars per trainset
- Operators: Odakyu Electric Railway

Specifications
- Width: 2,870 mm (9 ft 5 in)
- Doors: 4 pairs per side
- Maximum speed: 100 km/h (62 mph) (service); 120 km/h (75 mph) (design)
- Traction motors: Mitsubishi DC compound motor
- Power output: 110 kW x4 per motored car
- Electric system(s): 1,500 V DC overhead lines
- Current collection: Pantograph
- Bogies: FS085, FS385
- Braking system(s): Regenerative braking, dynamic braking
- Multiple working: 2600/4000I/5000I/8000/1000/3000 series
- Track gauge: 1,067 mm (3 ft 6 in)

The Odakyu 9000 series (小田急9000形, Odakyū 9000-gata) was a commuter electric multiple unit (EMU) train type operated by the private railway operator Odakyu Electric Railway in Japan from 1972 until 2006.

== Technical specifications ==
The trains were equipped with 110 kW motors and chopper control.

=== Formations ===
The fleet consisted of nine four-car and nine six-car sets. The sets were formed as follows.

Four-car sets

Designation	M1c	M1	M2	M2c
Numbering	9000	9100	9200	9300

Six-car sets

Designation	M1c	M2	T1	T2	M1	M2c
Numbering	9400	9500	9550	9650	9600	9700

== History ==
The trains entered service in 1972, and were the recipient of the 1973 Laurel Prize. Chiyoda Line through services with 9000 series trains began on March 31, 1978. The trains were withdrawn from service in March 2006. A farewell run between Hadano and Karakida was operated on May 13, 2006.

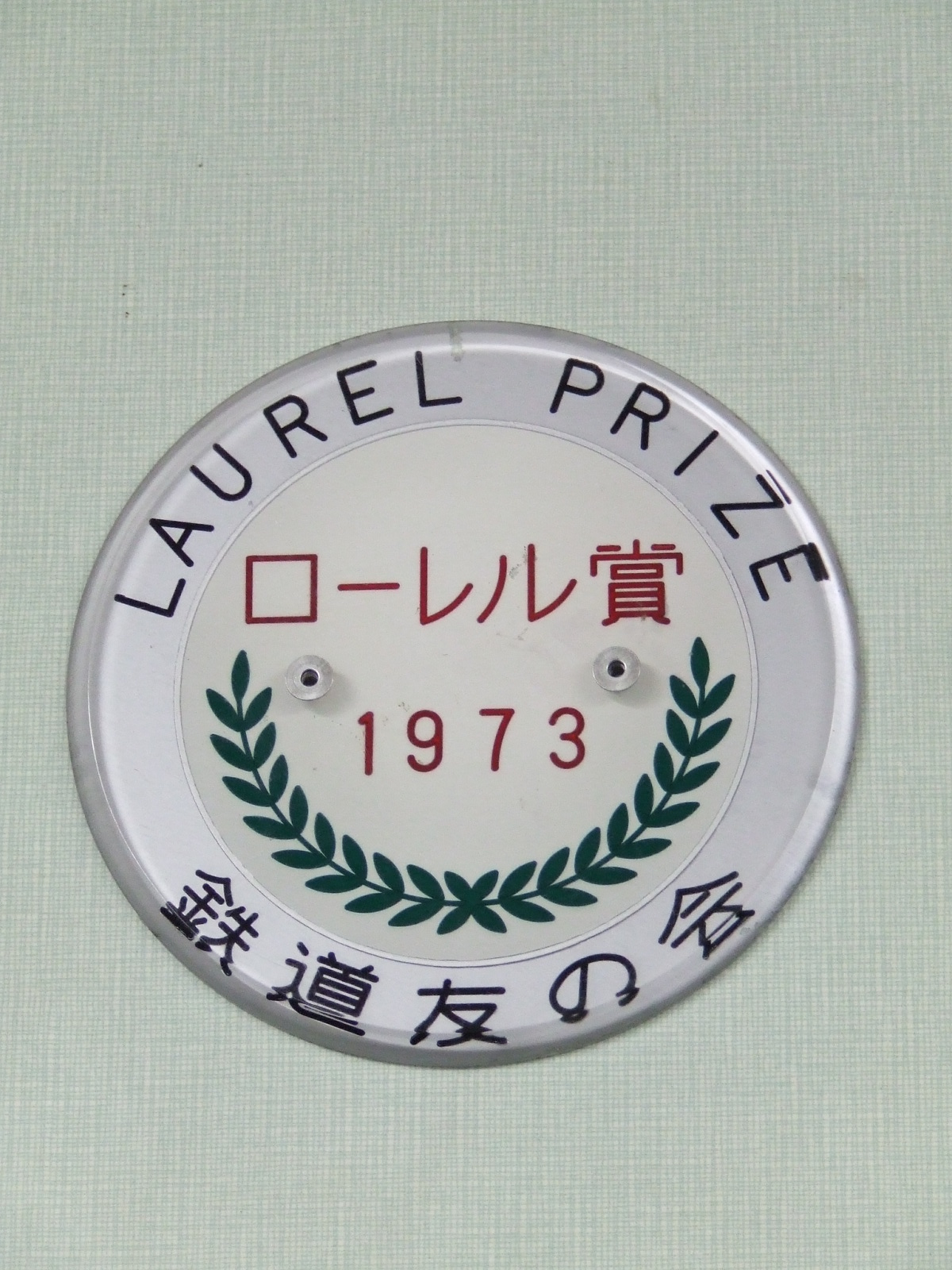
Laurel Prize 1973 plaque

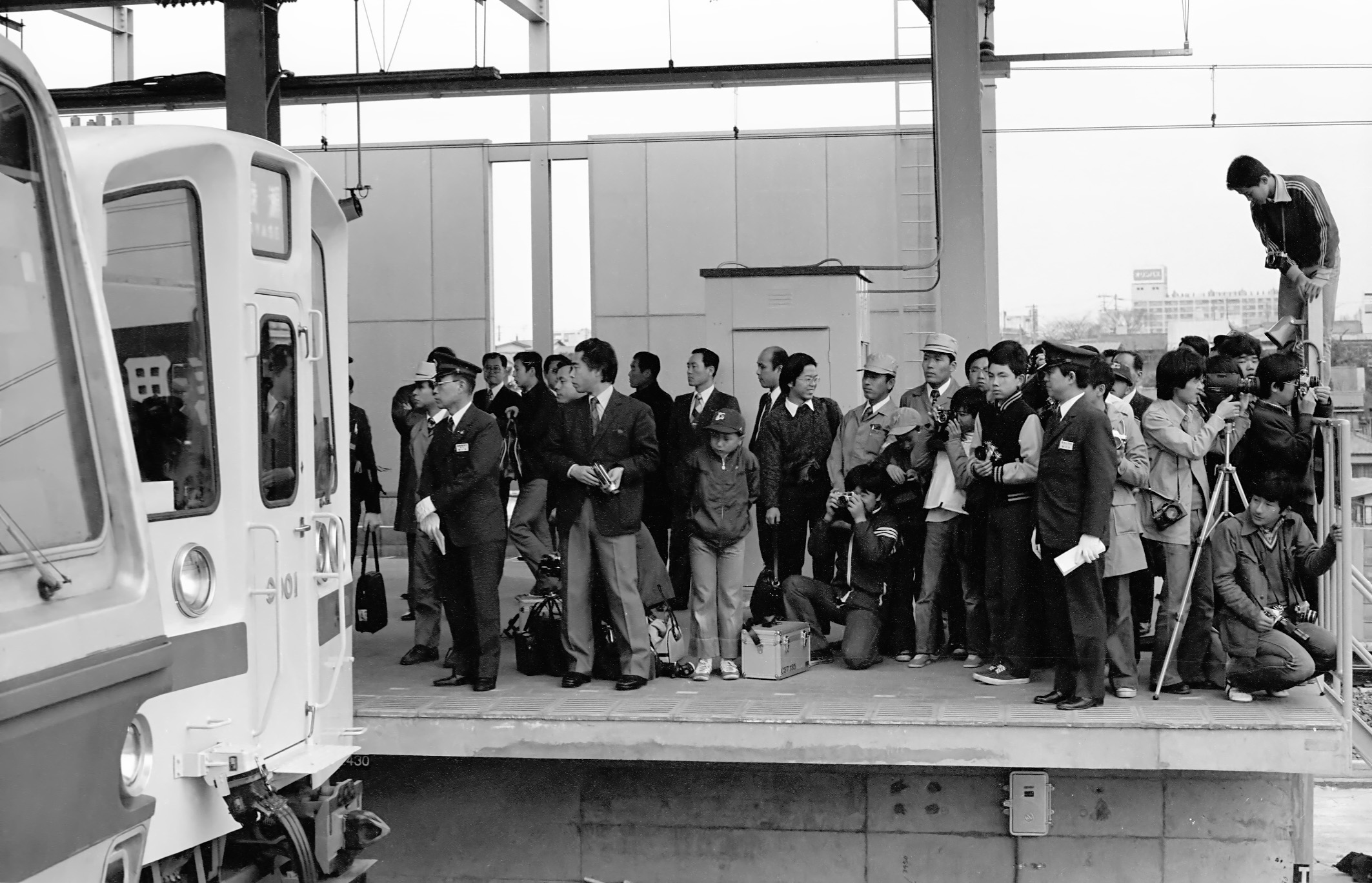
First Odakyu and Chiyoda Line through-services on March 31, 1978

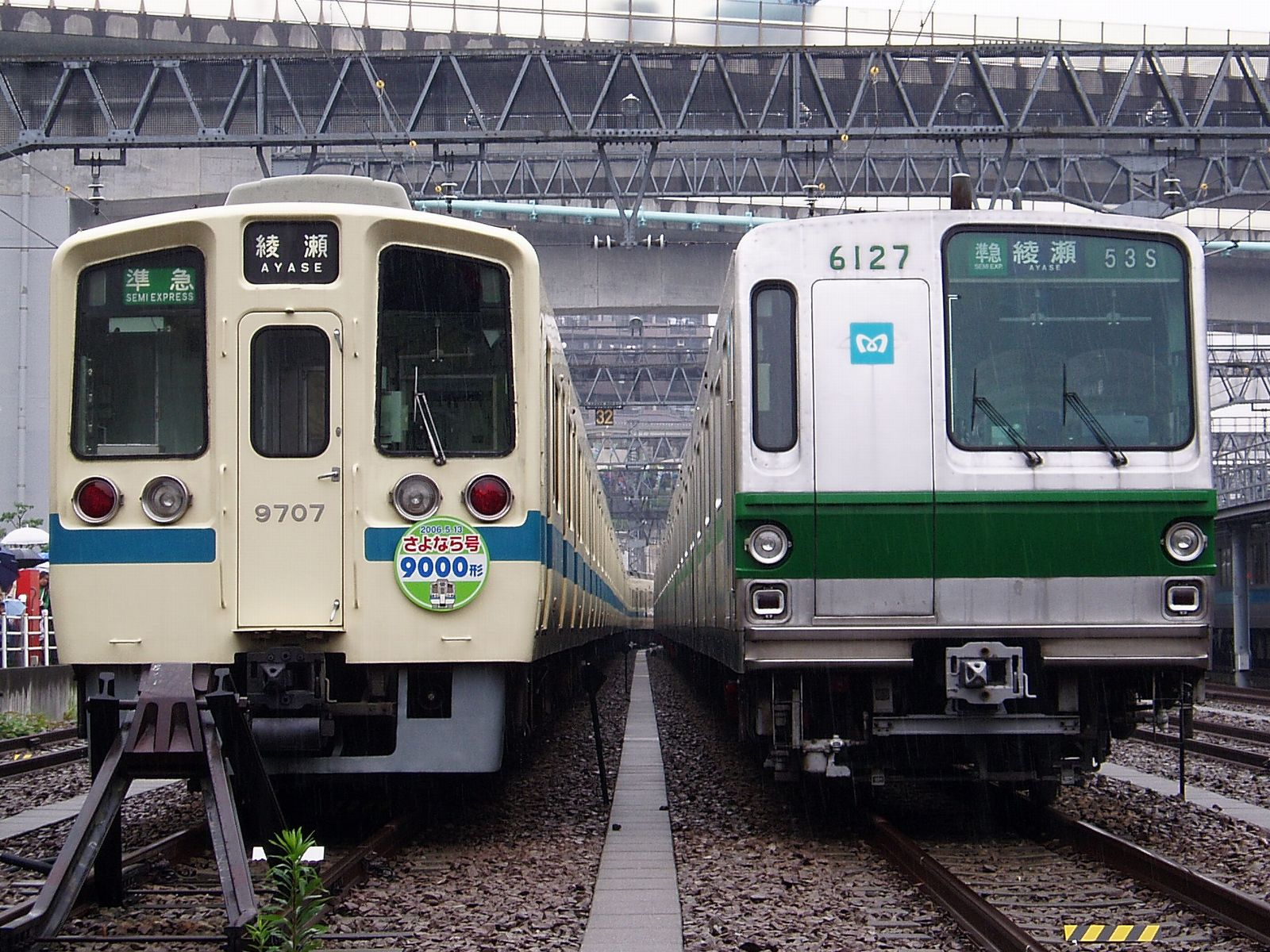
9000 series (left) with "Sayonara" headboard on May 13, 2006

== Preserved examples ==
- Deha 9001: stored at the Kitami inspection facility

== Derivatives ==
Trains of a similar design operate on the Roca Line in Argentina.
