= Canine =

Canine may refer to:

== Zoology and anatomy ==
- Animals of the family Canidae, more specifically the subfamily Caninae, which includes dogs, wolves, foxes, jackals and coyotes
  - Canis, a genus that includes dogs, wolves, coyotes, and jackals
  - Dog, the domestic dog
- Canine tooth, in mammalian oral anatomy

== People with the surname ==
- Henry Canine (fl. 1938), American football coach
- Ralph Canine (1895–1969), founding director of the United States National Security Agency

== Other uses ==
- Canine, a fictional dog in the Glenn Martin, DDS animated television series
- Canine Hills, Antarctic landform in the Bowers Mountains, Victoria Land

== See also ==
- K9 (disambiguation)
- Kanine (disambiguation)
- Canina (disambiguation)
- Cani (disambiguation)
- List of canids
