= Odakyu 5000 series (1969) =

Japanese train type

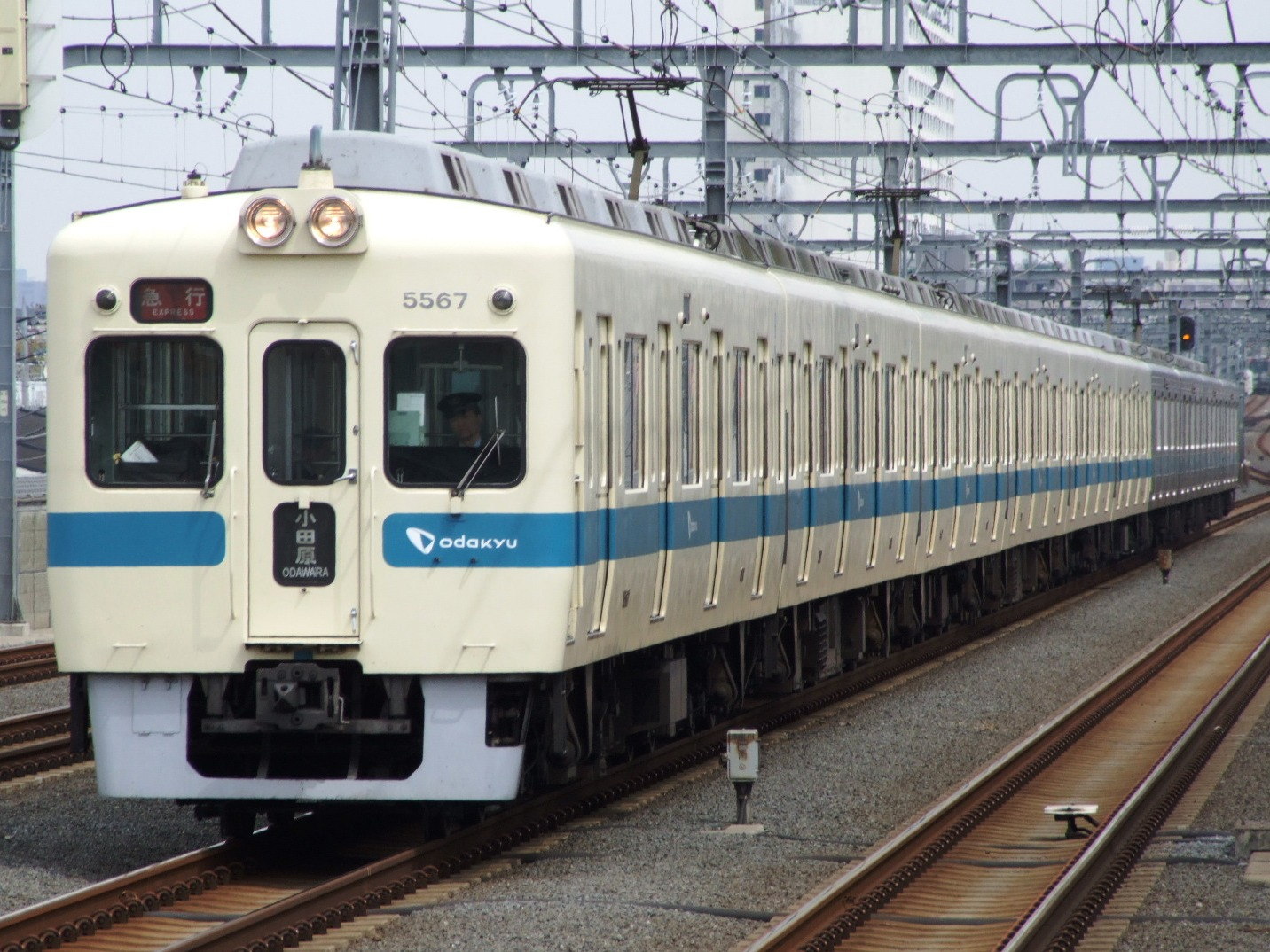
- Odakyu 5000 series, April 2008
- In service: 24 November 1969 – 16 March 2012
- Manufacturer: Kawasaki Heavy Industries, Tokyu Car Corporation, Nippon Sharyo
- Constructed: 1969 – 1982
- Number built: 180 vehicles (35 sets)
- Number in service: None
- Formation: 4/6-car sets
- Operators: Odakyu Electric Railway
- Depots: Kitami

Specifications
- Car body construction: Steel
- Car length: 20 m (65 ft 7 in)
- Doors: 4 pairs per side
- Maximum speed: 100 km/h (service); 120 km/h (design)
- Traction system: Mitsubishi resistor control (vernier control)(electric camshaft); 25 steps in series, 31 steps in parallel, 7 steps of field weakening and 55 steps for braking
- Traction motors: Mitsubishi DC series motor
- Power output: 135 kW x4 per motored car
- Acceleration: 2.4 km/h/s (4-car sets)
- Electric system(s): 1,500 V DC
- Current collector(s): Overhead lines
- Braking system(s): Dynamic braking
- Multiple working: 8000/1000/3000 series
- Track gauge: 1,067 mm (3 ft 6 in)

The Odakyu 5000 series (小田急5000形, Odakyū 5000-gata) was a commuter electric multiple unit (EMU) train type operated by the private railway operator Odakyu Electric Railway in Japan from November 1969 until March 2012.

== Formation ==
Trains were formed as 4- and 6-car sets as shown below.

=== 4-car sets ===
Designation	Tc1	M1	M2	Tc2
Numbering	5050	5000	5100	5150

The M1 and M2 cars each had one single-arm pantograph.

=== 6-car sets ===
Designation	Tc1	M1	M2	M3	M4	Tc2
Numbering	5250	5200	5300	5400	5500	5550

The M2 and M4 cars each had one single-arm pantograph.

== Interior ==
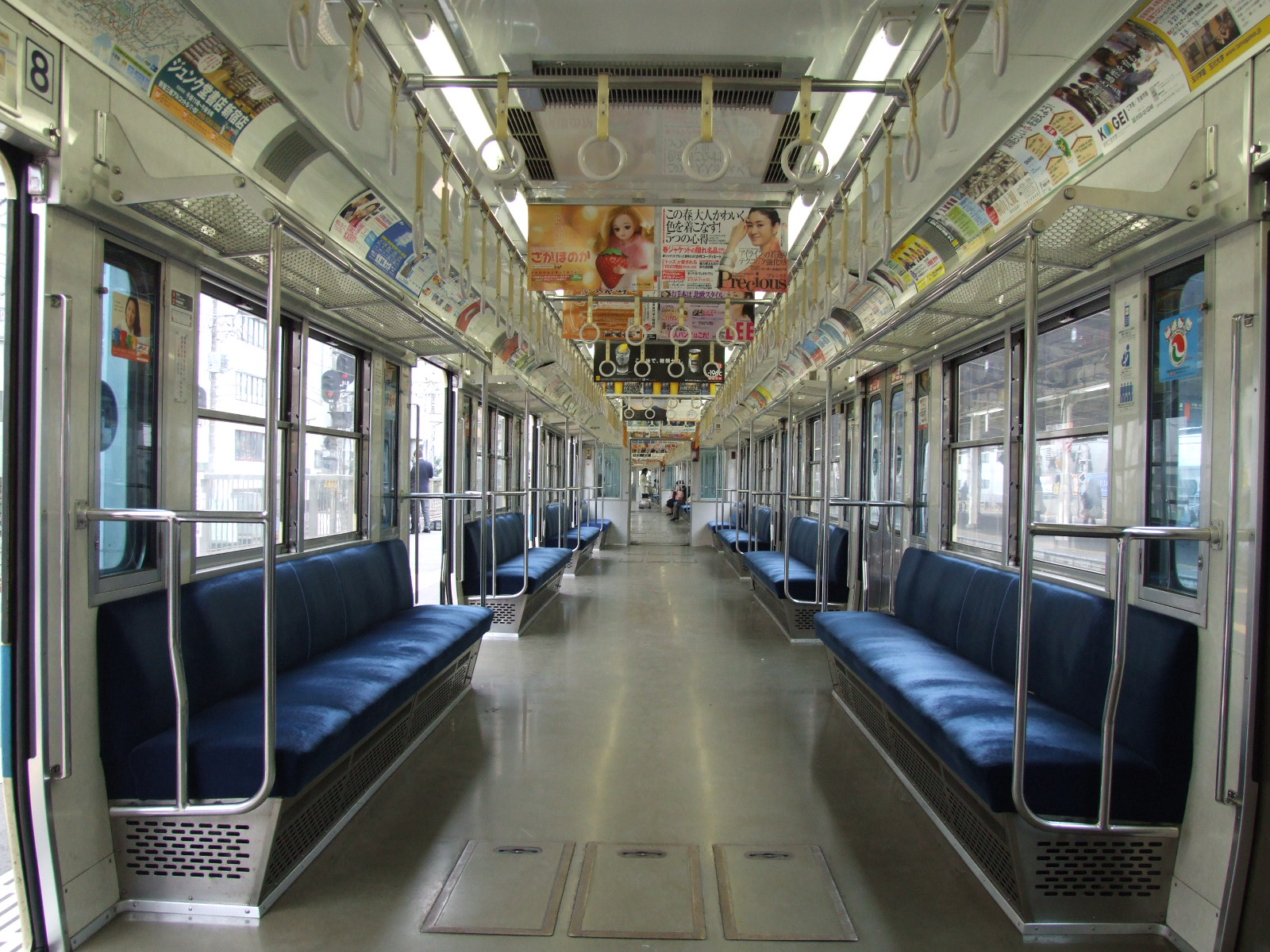
Interior view of 5000 series (4-car set), February 2008

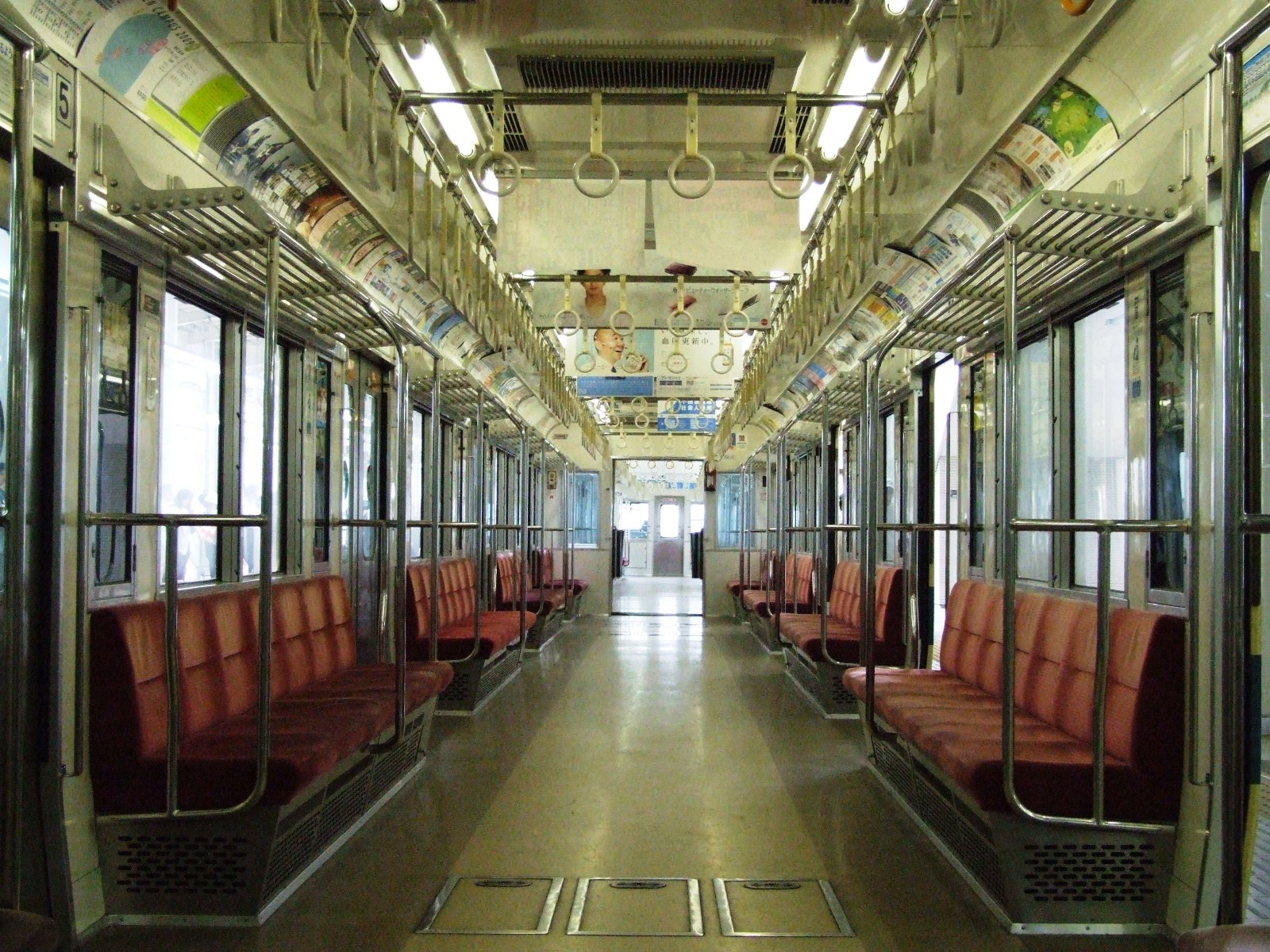
Interior view of 5200 series (6-car set), June 2009

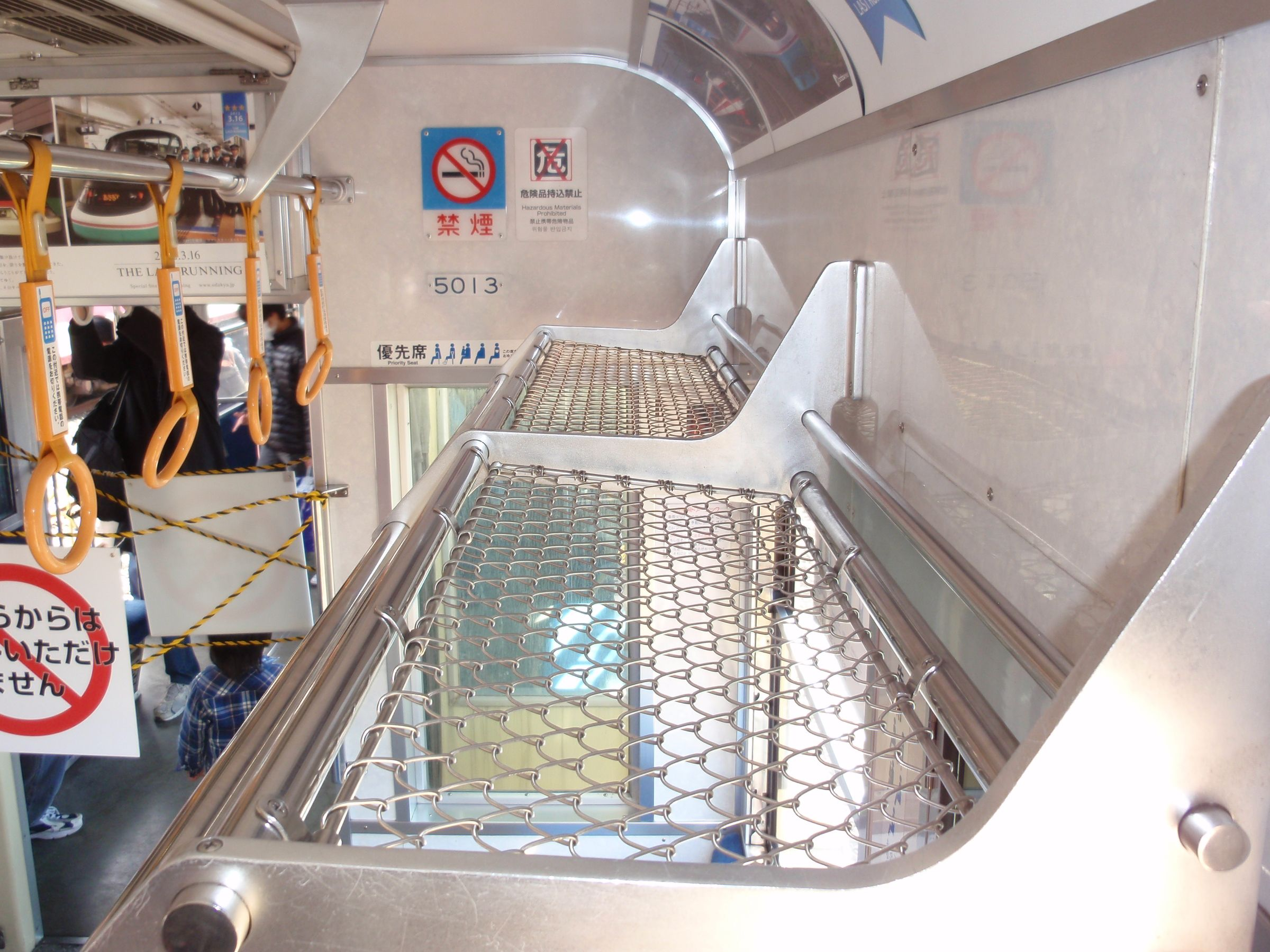
Luggage rack of 5000 series, March 2012

== History ==
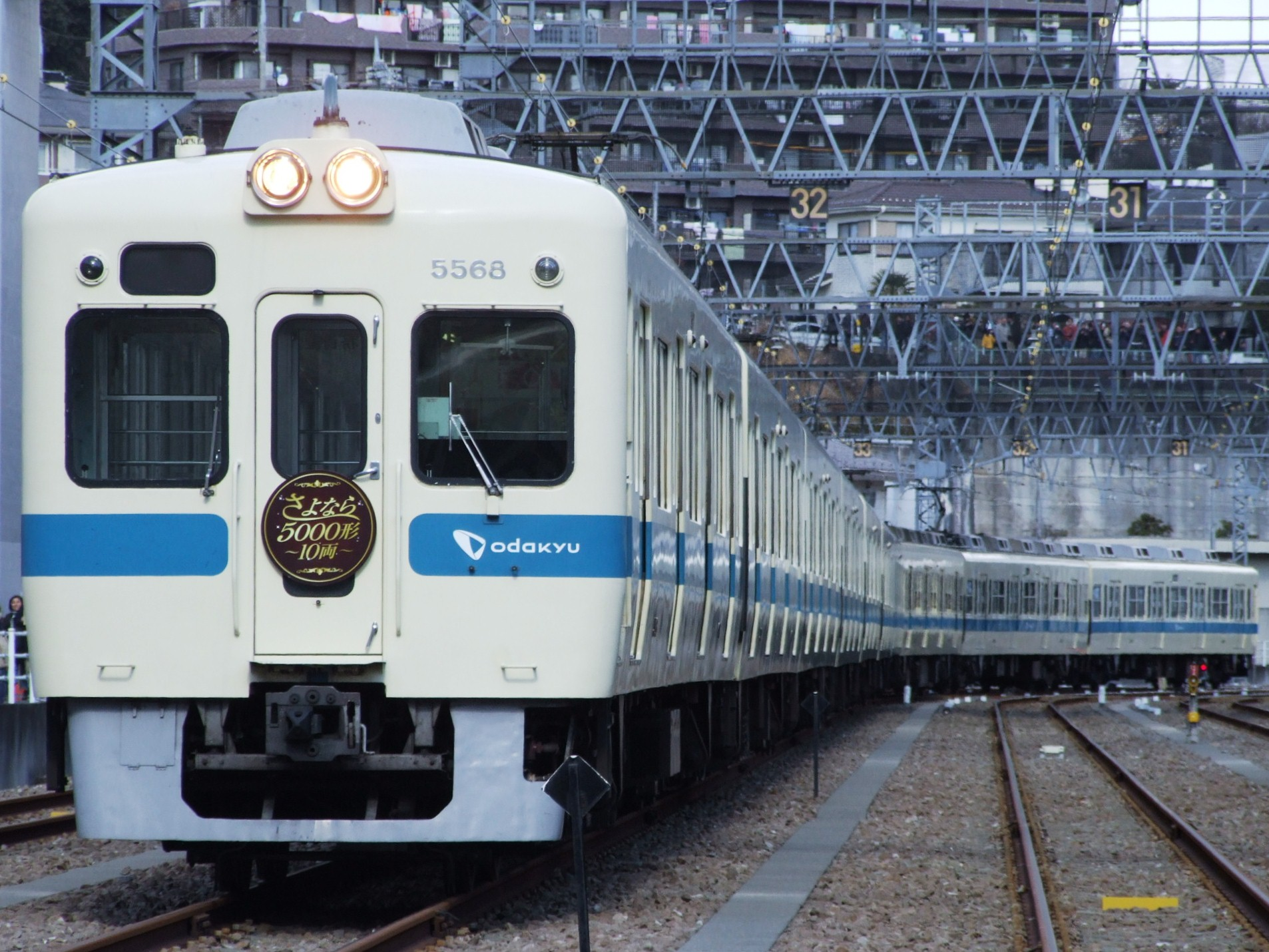
5000 series on final day of operations, 30 January 2011

The 5000 series was introduced from 1969, with a total of 15 sets (60 vehicles) built. These were augmented from 1978 by 20 6-car sets (120 vehicles), classified as 5200 series. Traction motors as well as control device were built by Mitsubishi Electric.

4+6-car formations were gradually replaced by new 4000 series sets, and the 6-car sets were withdrawn following the last day of operations on 30 January 2011. The remaining 4-car sets were withdrawn on 16 March 2012.
