= Kanine =

Kanine may refer to:

- Kaninë, settlement in the Vlorë County of southwestern Albania
- Kanine Records, independent record label

== See also ==
- Canine (disambiguation)
- K9 (disambiguation)
