= Odakyu 1000 series =

Electric multiple unit of Odakyu Electric Railway

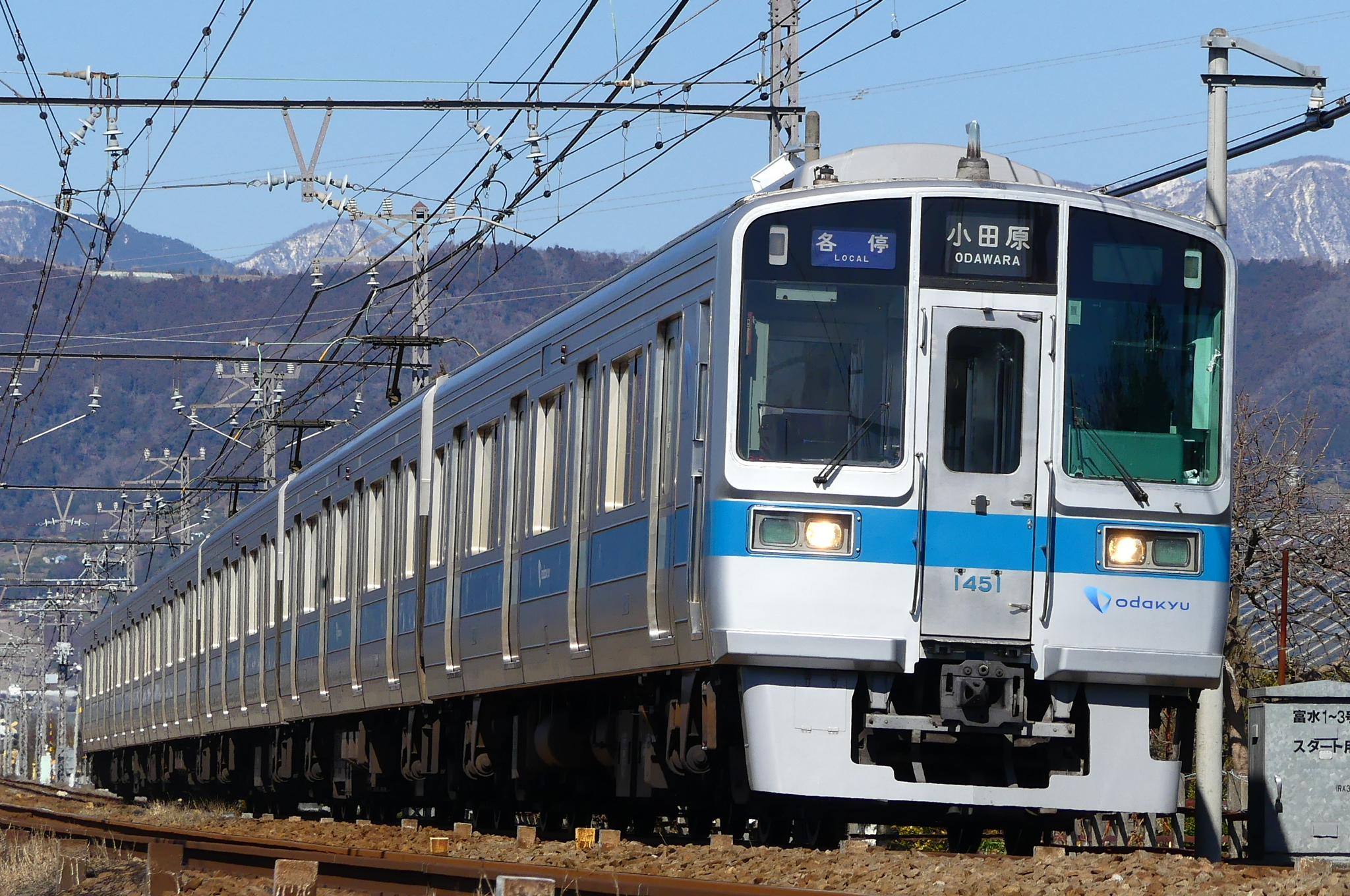
- An Odakyu 1000 series 6-car formation near Tomizu Station in January 2018
- In service: 22 March 1988 – Present
- Manufacturers: Kawasaki Heavy Industries, Tokyu Car Corporation, Nippon Sharyo
- Constructed: 1987–1993
- Refurbished: 2014–
- Scrapped: 2020–
- Number built: 196 vehicles
- Number in service: 174 vehicles
- Number scrapped: 22 cars
- Formation: 4/6/8/10 cars per unit
- Operator: Odakyu Electric Railway
- Depots: Ebina, Kitami

Specifications
- Car body construction: Stainless steel
- Car length: 20 m (65 ft 7 3/8 in)
- Doors: 4 pairs per side
- Maximum speed: 100 km/h (62 mph) (service); 110 km/h (68 mph) (design)
- Traction system: Mitsubishi-made 2-level VVVF (before refurbishment : GTO switching device) (after refurbishment : SiC-MOSFET switching device)
- Traction motors: Mitsubishi-made three-phase squirrel-cage induction motor
- Power output: 175 kW x4 per motored car (before refurbishment); 190 kW x4 per motored car (after refurbishment)
- Acceleration: 3.3 km/(h⋅s) (2.1 mph/s)
- Deceleration: 4.0 km/(h⋅s) (2.5 mph/s) (service); 4.5 km/(h⋅s) (2.8 mph/s) (emergency)
- Electric system: 1,500 V DC overhead line
- Braking system: Regenerative braking
- Multiple working: 5000I/9000/8000/3000 series
- Track gauge: 1,067 mm (3 ft 6 in)

The Odakyu 1000 series (小田急1000形, Odakyū 1000-gata) is an electric multiple unit (EMU) commuter train type operated by the private railway operator Odakyu Electric Railway in the Tokyo area of Japan. Built between 1987 and 1993, the first train entered service in March 1988.

== Formations ==
As of 1 April 2017, the fleet consists of 196 vehicles, formed as 4-, 6-, 8-, and 10-car sets, with car 1 at the western end.

=== 10-car sets ===
The six ten-car sets, 1091 to 1096, are formed as follows.

Car No.	1	2	3	4	5	6	7	8	9	10
Designation	Tc2	M5	T3	M4	M3	T2	T1	M2	M1	Tc1
Numbering	149x	144x	139x	134x	124x	129x	119x	114x	104x	109x

- Cars 3, 5, 8, and 9 are each equipped with one single-arm pantograph.
- Car 2 is designated as a mildly-air-conditioned car.

=== 8-car set ===
The single eight-car set, 1081, is formed as follows.

Car No.	1	2	3	4	5	6	7	8
Designation	Tc2	M5	T3	M4	T1	M2	M1	Tc1
Numbering	1481	1431	1381	1331	1181	1131	1031	1081

- Cars 3, 4, 6, and 7 are each equipped with one single-arm pantograph.
- Car 2 is designated as a mildly-air-conditioned car.

=== 6-car sets 1251 to 1255 ===
The four six-car sets 1251 and 1253 to 1255 are formed as follows.

Car No.	1	2	3	4	5	6
Designation	Tc2	M3	T	M2	M1	Tc1
Numbering	145x	140x	135x	130x	120x	125x

- Cars 3, 4, and 5 are each equipped with one single-arm pantograph.
- Car 2 is designated as a mildly-air-conditioned car.

=== 6-car sets 1751 to 1756 ===
The six six-car 1500 series sets 1751 to 1756 are formed as follows. These sets have wider side doors.

Car No.	1	2	3	4	5	6
Designation	Tc2	M3	T	M2	M1	Tc1
Numbering	195x	190x	185x	180x	170x	175x

- On sets 1751 and 1752, cars 3, 4, and 5 are each equipped with one single-arm pantograph, while on sets 1753 to 1756, cars 2, 4, and 5 are each equipped with one single-arm pantograph
- Car 2 is designated as a mildly-air-conditioned car.

=== 4-car sets ===
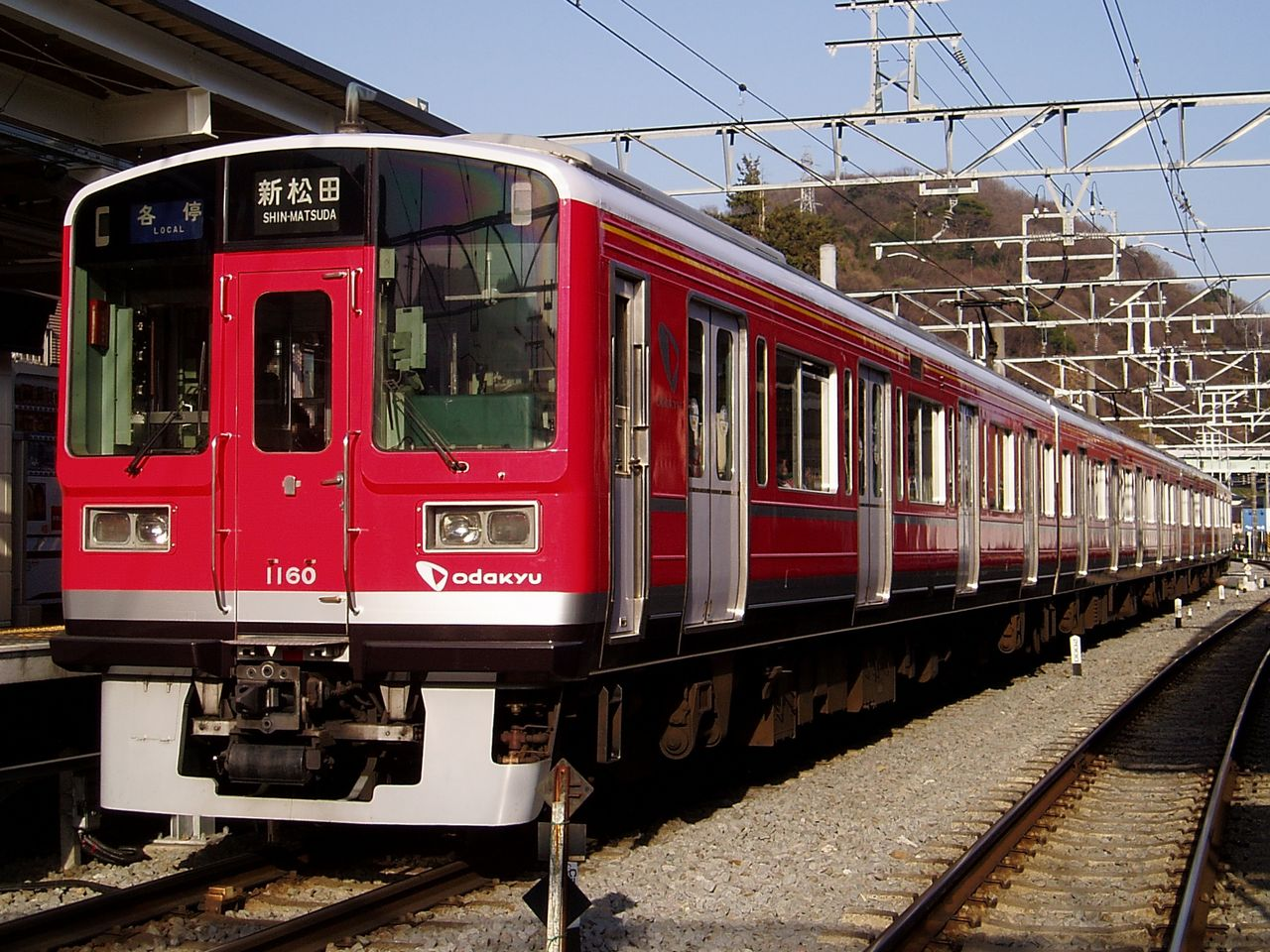
Hakone Tozan Railway liveried set 1060 in March 2009

The 19 four-car sets, 1051 to 1069 are formed as follows.

Car No.	1	2	3	4
Designation	Tc2	M2	M1	Tc1
Numbering	115x	110x	100x	105x

- Cars 2 and 3 are each equipped with one single-arm pantograph.

Sets 1058 to 1061 are finished in a red Hakone Tozan Railway livery, and are normally limited to services between Shin-Matsuda and Hakone-Yumoto.

== Interior ==
Passenger accommodation consists of longitudinal bench seating throughout.

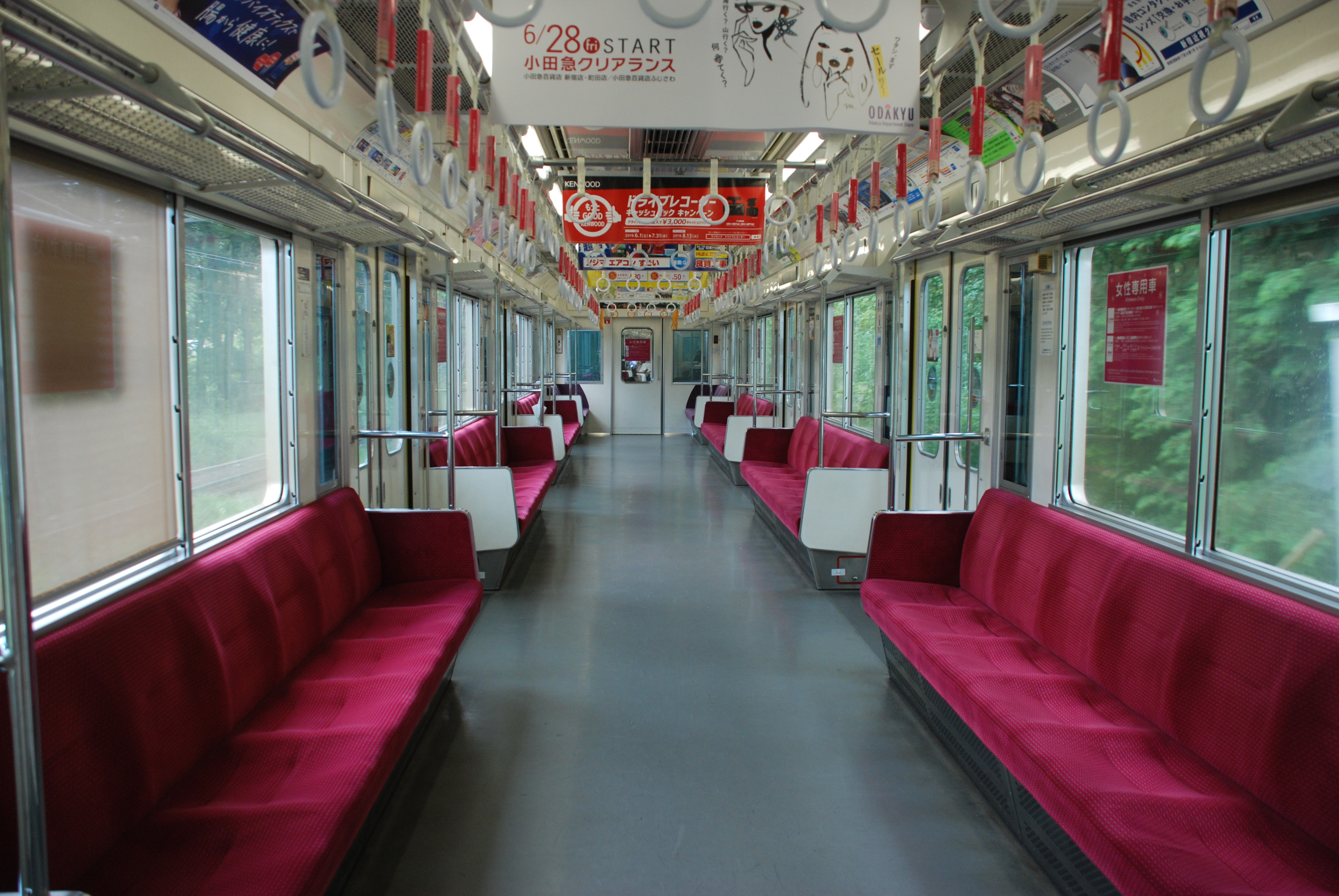
Interior view before refurbishment

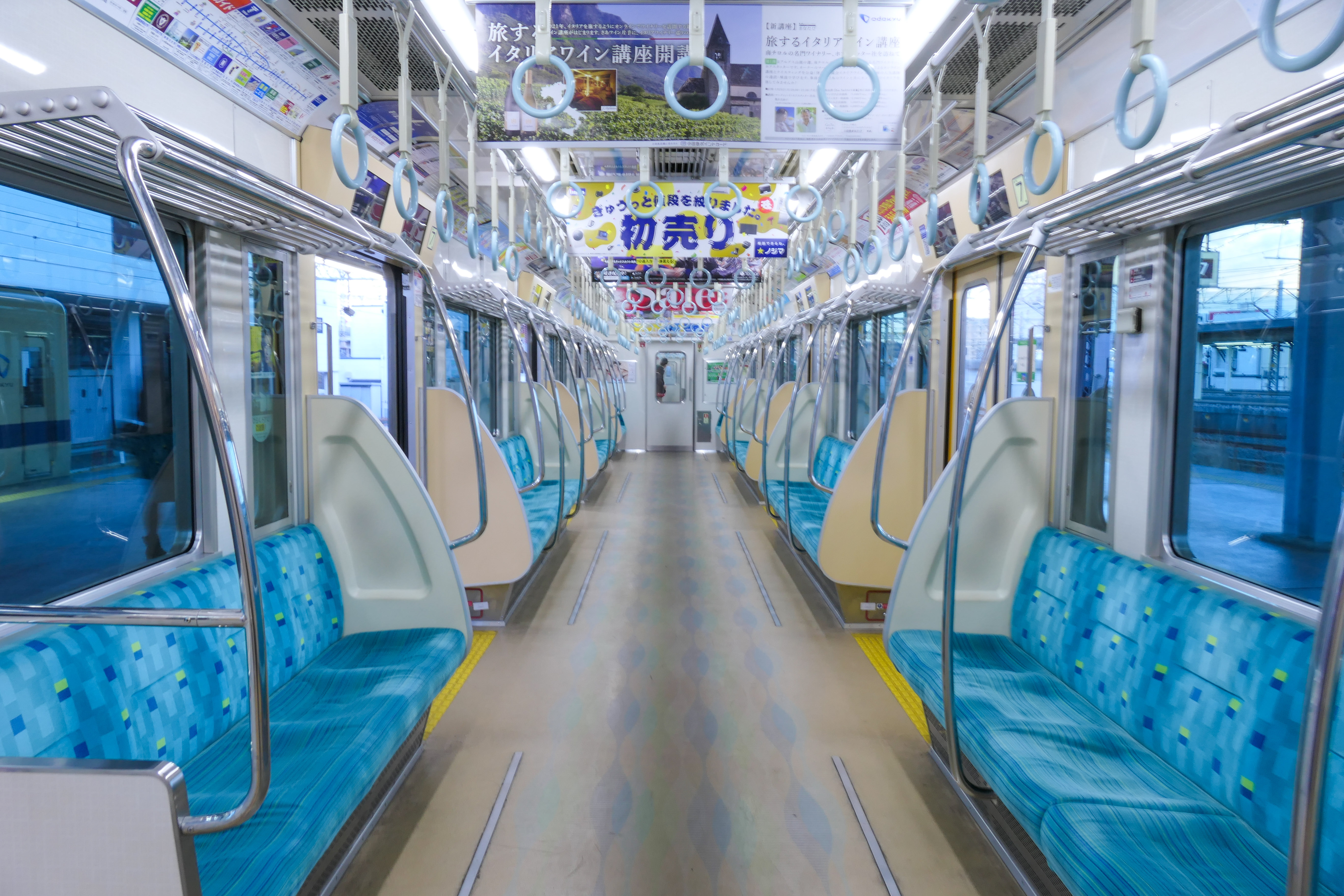
Interior view after refurbishment

== History ==
The first trains were delivered in December 1987, entering revenue service from 22 March 1988. From 2007, the train type was displaced from Tokyo Metro Chiyoda Line services by new 4000 series 10-car sets. Since then, they have been used on surface-level Odakyu Line services, as well as some portions of the Hakone Tozan Line.

=== Refurbishment ===
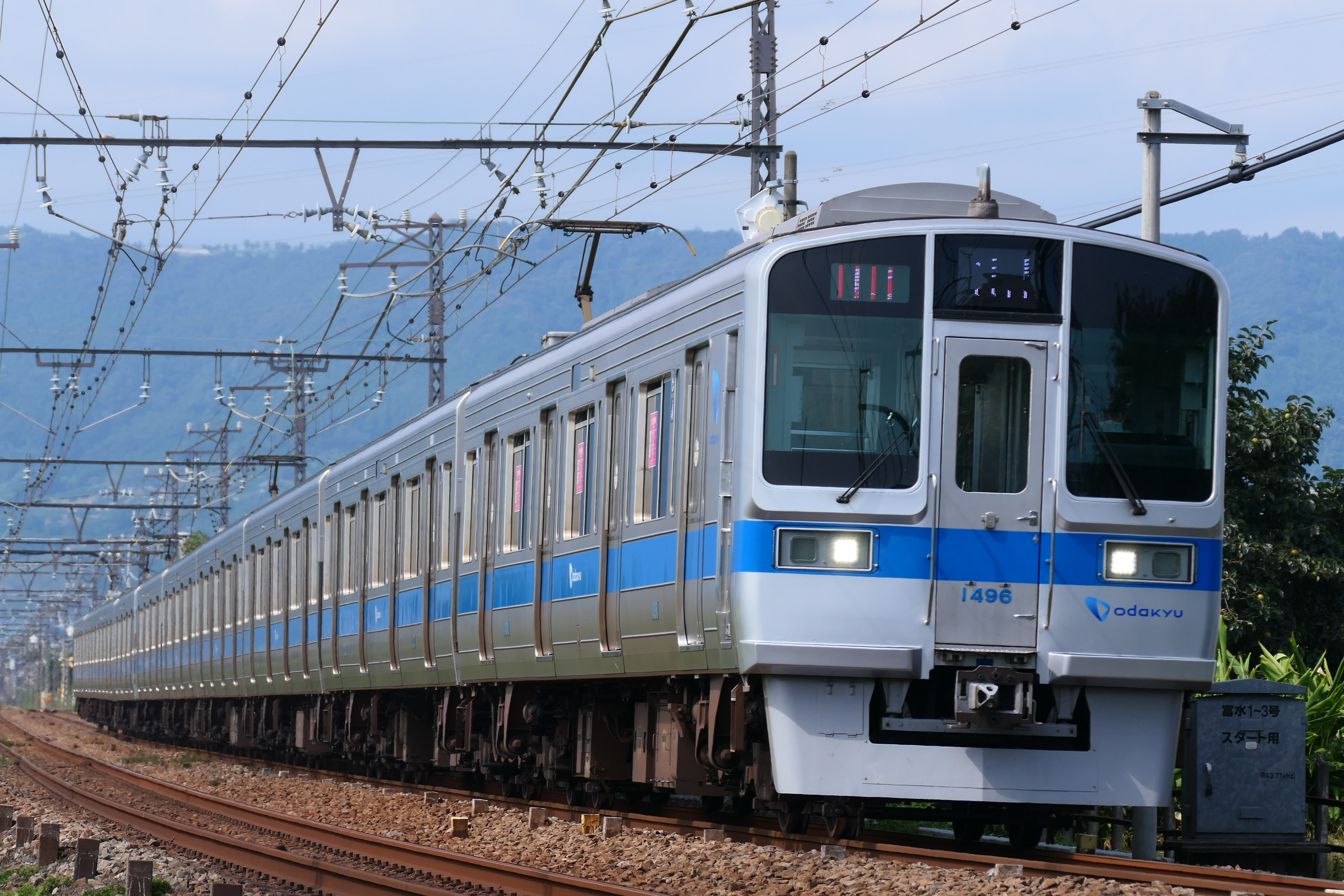
Refurbished 10-car set 1096 in August 2020

From 2014, 160 out of the operational fleet of 196 1000 series started undergoing a programme of life-extension refurbishment. The refurbishment includes the replacement of the existing traction motors with new 190 kW AC traction motors, silicon carbide inverter traction control, and new air-conditioning units with 8% higher capacity. The interiors were completely refurbished with LED lighting, LCD passenger information displays above the doorways, and new moquette seat covers. The exteriors also received LED headlights and direction indicators.

As of August 2022, two unrefurbished trainsets remain in operation: a 6-car set and a 4-car set.
