= 9000 =

9000 may refer to:

- 9000 (number)
- The last year of the 9th millennium, an exceptional common year starting on Wednesday

== Business ==
- ISO 9000, a family of standards for quality management systems
- TL 9000, a quality management system

== Entertainment ==
- BFG 9000, a fictional weapon
- HAL 9000, a fictional computer

== Technology ==
- IBM ES/9000, a mainframe computer
- IBM System 9000, a family of microcomputers
- HP 9000, a family of workstation and server computers
- VAX 9000, a mainframe computer
- Nokia 9000 Communicator, a smart phone introduced in 1996
- ATI Radeon 9000, a computer graphics card series

== Transport ==
- 9000 series (disambiguation), Japanese, Korean, Latin America and Spanish train types
- Saab 9000, an executive car

== Other ==
- 9000 Hal, an asteroid
- It's Over 9000!, an internet meme
