= 9000 series =

9000 series may refer to:

== Train types ==
=== Japanese train types ===
- Chiba New Town Railway 9000 series electric multiple unit train
- Hankyu 9000 series electric multiple unit train
- Hanshin 9000 series electric multiple unit train, operated by Hanshin Electric Railway
- Keihan 9000 series electric multiple unit train
- Keio 9000 series electric multiple unit train
- Kintetsu 9000 series electric multiple unit train, operated by Kintetsu Railway
- Kita-Osaka Kyuko 9000 series electric multiple unit train
- Nankai 9000 series electric multiple unit train, operated by Nankai Electric Railway
- Nishitetsu 9000 series electric multiple unit train
- Odakyu 9000 series electric multiple unit train, operated by Odakyu Electric Railway
- Sapporo Municipal Subway 9000 series electric multiple unit train
- Seibu 9000 series electric multiple unit train
- Sotetsu 9000 series electric multiple unit train
- Tobu 9000 series electric multiple unit train
- Toei 9000 series tramcar
- Tokyo Metro 9000 series electric multiple unit train
- Tokyu 9000 series electric multiple unit train, operated by Tokyu Corporation

=== Korean train types ===
- Seoul Metro 9000 series

=== Latin American and Spanish train types ===
- Barcelona Metro 9000 Series for the Barcelona, Santo Domingo, and Lima Metros

== Computing ==
- UNIVAC 9000 series

== See also ==
- 900 series (disambiguation)
