= Odakyu 4000 series =

Japanese train type

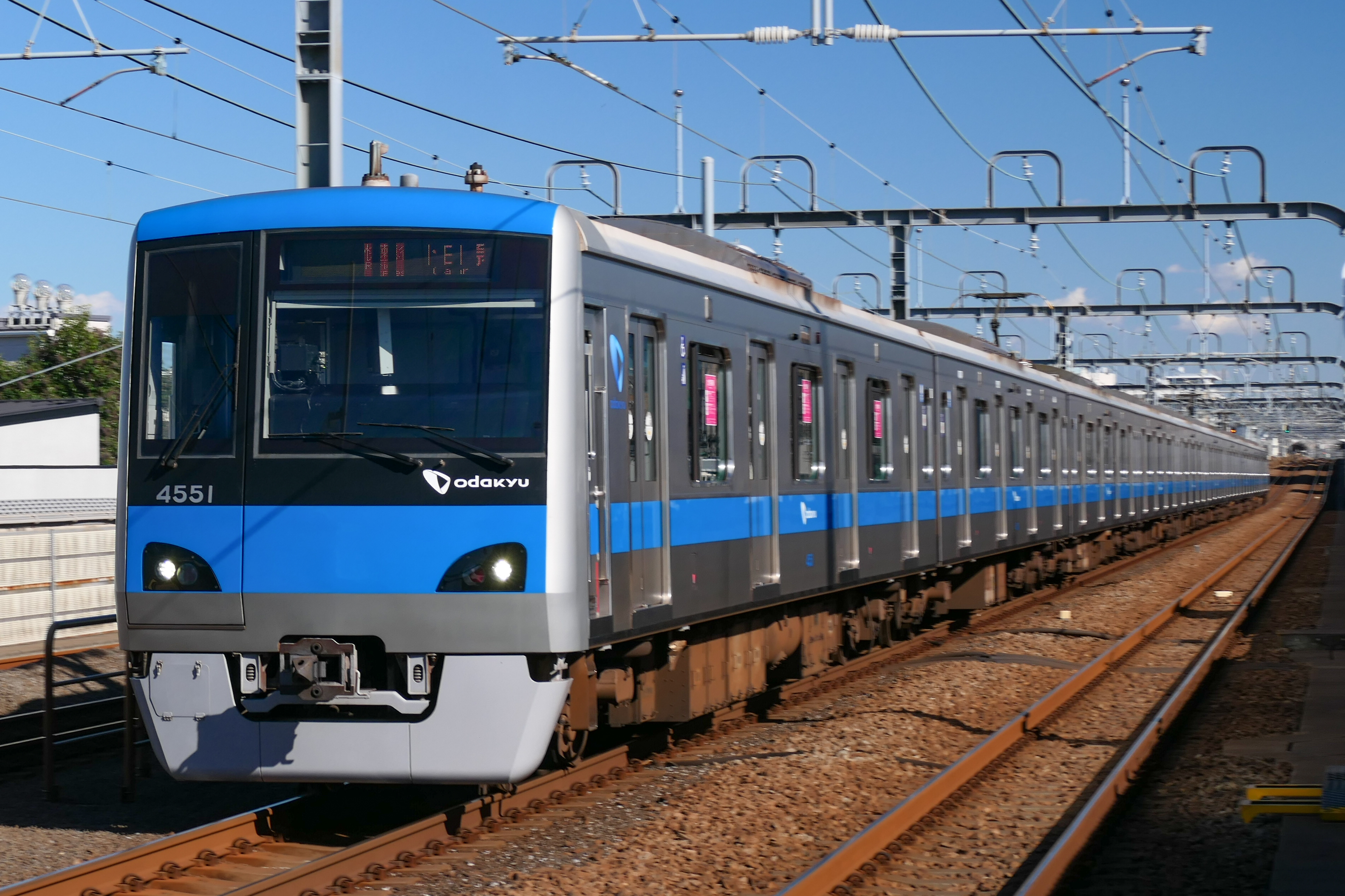
- Manufacturers: Tokyu Car Corporation, J-TREC, JR East
- Built at: Yokohama, Niitsu
- Replaced: Odakyu 1000 series
- Constructed: 2007–2016
- Entered service: 22 September 2007
- Number built: 160 vehicles (16 sets)
- Number in service: 160 vehicles (16 sets) (as of 10 February 2023)
- Formation: 10-car sets
- Fleet numbers: 4051–4066
- Operator: Odakyu Electric Railway
- Depot: Kitami
- Lines served: Odakyu Odawara Line; Odakyu Tama Line; Odakyu Enoshima Line; Tokyo Metro Chiyoda Line; JR East Joban Line

Specifications
- Car body construction: Stainless steel
- Car length: 20 m (65 ft 7 in)
- Doors: 4 pairs per side
- Maximum speed: 100 km/h (62 mph)
- Traction system: Variable frequency (IGBT)
- Power output: 190 kW per motor
- Acceleration: 3.3 km/(h⋅s) (2.1 mph/s)
- Deceleration: 4.0 km/(h⋅s) (2.5 mph/s) (service); 4.7 km/(h⋅s) (2.9 mph/s) (emergency)
- Electric system: 1,500 V DC Overhead lines
- Current collection: Pantograph
- Braking system: Regenerative brake
- Safety systems: OM-ATS, D-ATS-P, CS-ATC
- Track gauge: 1,067 mm (3 ft 6 in)

The Odakyu 4000 series (小田急4000形, Odakyū 4000-gata) is a 1,500 V DC commuter electric multiple unit (EMU) train type operated by the private railway operator Odakyu Electric Railway in Japan since 2007.

== Design ==
The trains are based on the JR East E233 series EMU design. The traction motors are fully enclosed to reduce environmental noise.

== Formation ==
As of 1 April 2016, 15 ten-car sets are in service, numbered 4051 to 4065, and formed as follows.

Car No.	1	2	3	4	5	6	7	8	9	10
Designation	Tc2	M6	M5	T2	T1	M4	M3	M2	M1	Tc1
Numbering	4550	4500	4400	4450	4350	4300	4200	4100	4000	4050

- Cars 3, 7, and 9 each have one single-arm pantograph.
- Car 2 is designated as a mildly air-conditioned car.

== Interior ==
Passenger accommodation consists of longitudinal bench seating throughout. Cars 1 and 10 have wheelchair spaces.

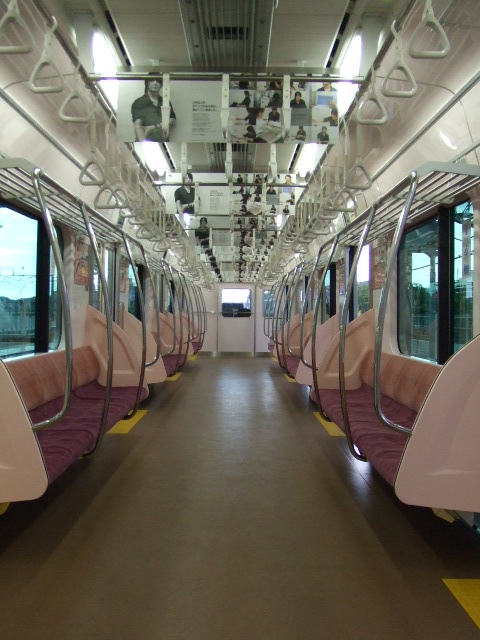
Interior view

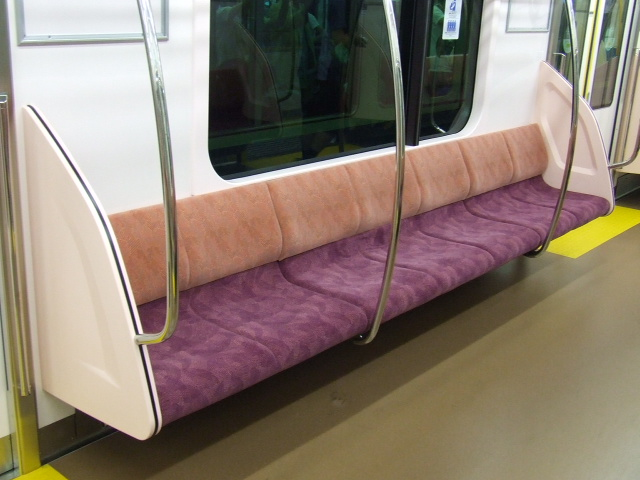
Seating

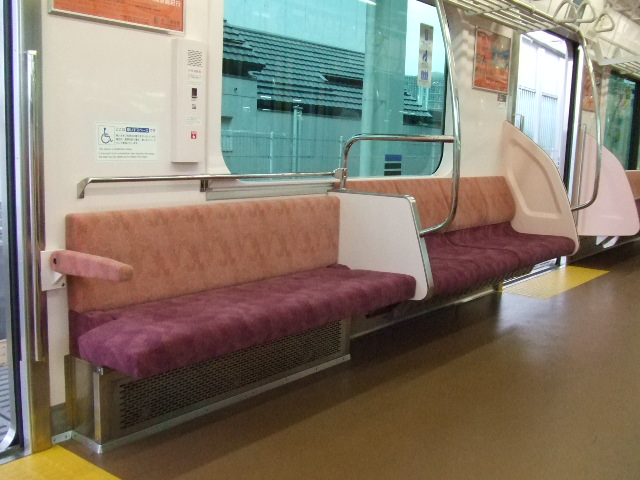
Tip-up seat for wheelchair space

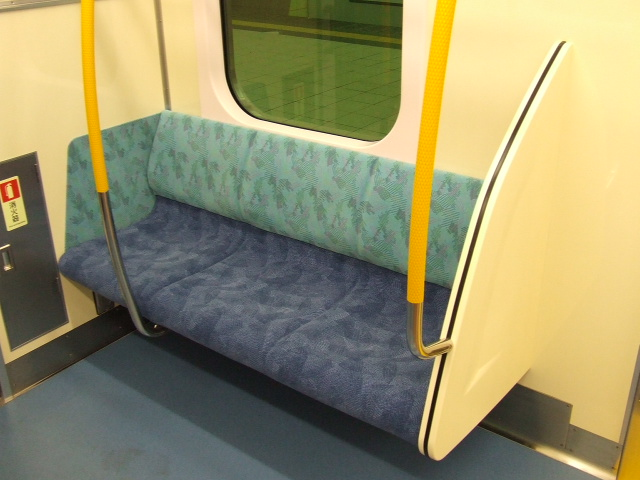
Priority seating

== History ==
The first train was delivered in May 2007, and the trains entered service in September 2007 on inter-running services between Odakyu and the Tokyo Metro Chiyoda Line, displacing 1000 series sets, which were cascaded to surface lines to replace older 5000 and 5200 series sets.

From 26 March 2016, the 4000 series began operation on the JR East Joban Line.
