= Dhimitër Çani =

Albanian sculptor (1904–1990)

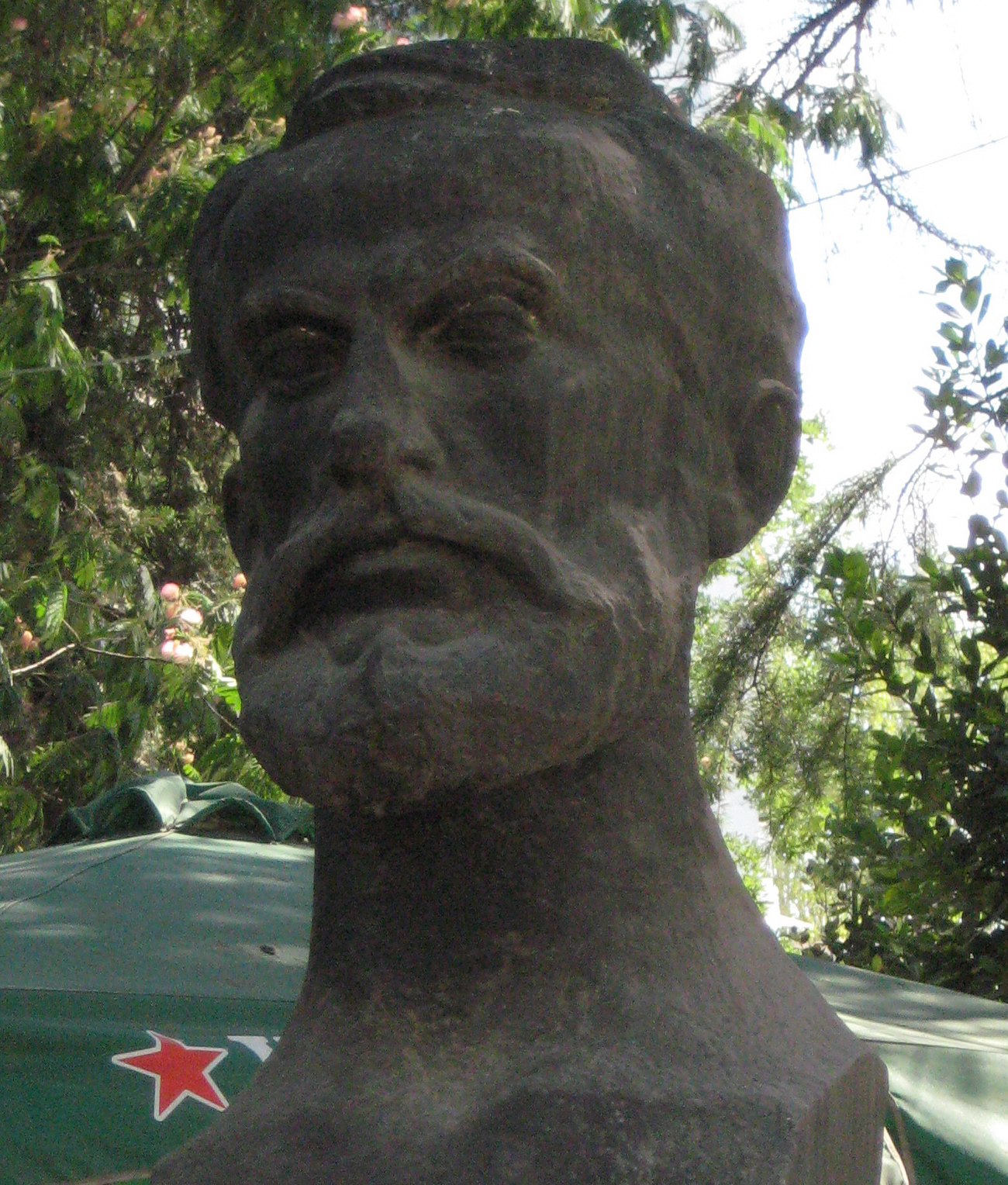
Memorial of Sami Frashëri in Tirana

Dhimitër Çani (1904 in Korçë, Manastir Vilayet, Ottoman Empire – 1990) was an Albanian sculptor. He graduated at the Accademia di Belle Arti di Roma in Rome, Italy.
