= Luigi Cani =

Brazilian stunt performer

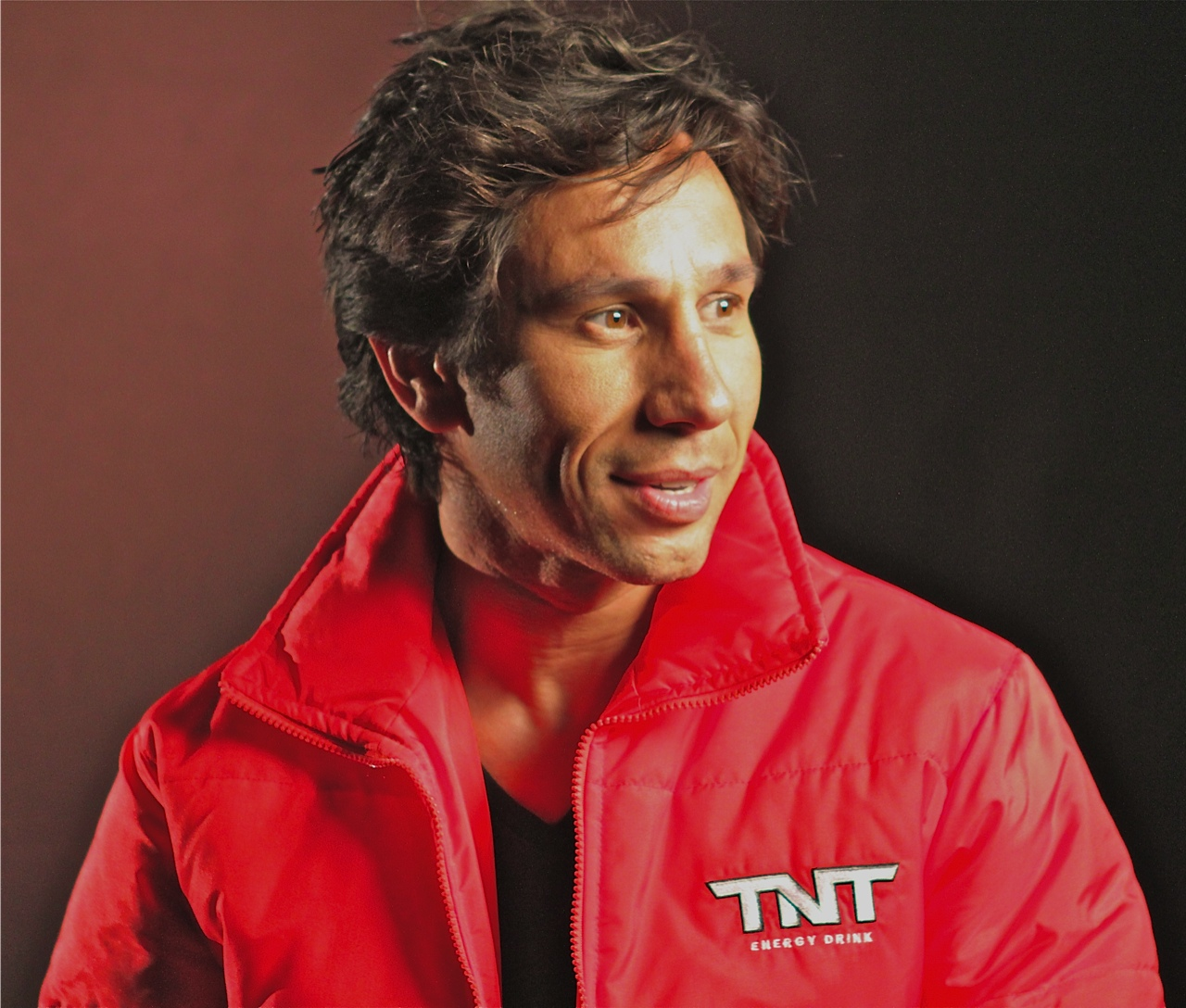
Luigi Cani - Skydiver

Luigi Cani (born December 4, 1970) is a Brazilian stunt performer and cinematographic producer. He is a well known athlete in parachuting.

== Individual world records and most feats ==
- 2000: Along with his teammates, was the first parachutist to proximity fly the Swiss Alps, creating a new skydiving sport discipline now known as Speed flying.
- 2000, 2004, 2008, 2021: World smallest parachute ever jumped and landed (SLeia 34).
- 2000, 2004, 2008: World fastest speed flying with a high performance parachute.
- 2000, 2001, 2002, 2003, 2004: Honored as one of the world's top 10 High Performance Parachute Pilots.
- 2002: Along with his teammates was the first to land canopies on top of Europe's highest peak, Mont Blanc.
- 2004: First skydiver to fly a high performance parachute in close proximity with a wingsuit pilot creating the new sport discipline called “XRW”.
- 2005: World fastest free fall speed at 343 mph / 552kmh (stream line body position).
- 2006: First human to ride a motorcycle at 160kmh (100 mph) into the Grand Canyon with a wingsuit and parachute.
- 2007: Wingsuit “proximity” fly-by within 5 meters of the Statue of Christ in Rio de Janeiro.
- 2008, 2009, 2010: Hired by the USA Military to coach Elite troops such as the Navy Seals, the Special Force and others.
- 2010: First human to fly a wingsuit in close formation with a jet fighter aircraft.
- 2010: First human to ride a motorcycle off the Rio-Niterói bridge over Guanabara Bay in Rio de Janeiro, Brasil.
- 2010: First Brazilian skydiver to re-enter an Airplane in free fall.
- 2011: First human to wingsuit fly between the Petronas Towers in Malaysia.

== TV shows ==
- 2003: Sports Reporter for ESPN Brazil
- 2003: Sports Reporter for GLOBO TV - Fantástico Show
- 2005: Host for a TV Series (Gravity Quest) on SPORTV - GloboSat
- 2006: Host for a TV Show (Globo TV - Cald Huck)
- 2011: Sports Reporter for Globo TV (Esp. Esp.)
- 2011: Host for a TV Series (Sem Asas) no OFF - Globosat
- 2011: Host for a TV Series (2-Elementos) on MULTISHOW - Globosat
