= Canina =

Canina ('canine' in Latin), may refer to:

- Canina (subtribe), a zoological taxon name (subtribe) belonging to the Canini tribe of the family Canidae (canids); Canina includes the domestic dog, coyote, jackals, Eurasian wild dogs species, and most species named wolves.
- Canina, an Italian surname:
  - Luigi Canina (1795–1856), Italian archaeologist and architect
- Canina, a California-based brand that develops content and clothing to inspire and equip people to be active with their dogs.
- Any of several cultivars of wine grape:
  - Uva Canina, a red Italian wine grape grown through Central Italy but most noted in Tuscany
  - Canina, another name for the French wine grape Tourbat
  - Canina, another name for the Italian wine grape Drupeggio
- Vōx canīna ('dog voice') and littera canīna ('the dog letter'), names used by the Romans to identify their pronunciation of the Latin letter r, and a name for the letter itself, respectively
- Tillandsia 'Canina', a plant hybrid cultivar

== See also ==
- , including use as a species name
- Caninae, one of the three subfamilies in the canid family
- Canine (disambiguation)
- Real Sociedad Canina de España
