= K-9: Public Security Bureau, Division 9 =

Japanese manga series

- K-9: Public Security Bureau, Division 9 – Special Abilities Countermeasure
- First tankōbon volume cover, featuring Yushiro Oboro (left) and Ren Hizuki (right)

K-9 警視庁公安部公安第9課異能対策係 (K-9: Keishichō Kōanbu Kōan Dai 9-ka Inō Taisaku-gakari)
- Genre: Action; Crime; Supernatural
- Manga
- Written by: Tetsuya Okuyama
- Published by: Kodansha
- English publisher: Kodansha
- Imprint: Shōnen Magazine Comics
- Magazine: Magazine Pocket
- Original run: April 16, 2025 – present
- Volumes: 8

K-9: Public Security Bureau, Division 9 – Special Abilities Countermeasure (K-9 警視庁公安部公安第9課異能対策係, K-9: Keishichō Kōanbu Kōan Dai 9-ka Inō Taisaku-gakari) is a Japanese manga series written and illustrated by Tetsuya Okuyama. It began serialization on Kodansha's Magazine Pocket manga service in April 2025.

== Synopsis ==
The series is centered around a supernatural phenomenon that manifests when a crime is committed called "Sin". Experienced detective Ren Hizuki, who has previously tackled cases involving "Sin" as part of the Investigation Division 1, has been transferred to the newly established Public Security Bureau, Division 9; pairing with the cowardly, but mysterious Yushiro Oboro in order to tackle cases involving "Sin".

== Publication ==
Written and illustrated by Tetsuya Okuyama, K-9: Public Security Bureau, Division 9 – Special Abilities Countermeasure began serialization on Kodansha's Magazine Pocket manga service on April 16, 2025. Its chapters have been collected in eight tankōbon volumes as of October 2026.

The series' chapters are published in English on Kodansha's K Manga app.

No.	Release date	ISBN
1	August 7, 2025	978-4-06-540344-0
2	October 9, 2025	978-4-06-541094-3
3	December 9, 2025	978-4-06-541894-9
4	February 9, 2026	978-4-06-542589-3
5	April 9, 2026	978-4-06-543308-9
6	June 9, 2026	978-4-06-543909-8
7	August 7, 2026	978-4-06-544602-7
8	October 8, 2026	978-4-06-545282-0

== Reception ==
The series was ranked tenth in the Nationwide Bookstore Employees' Recommended Comics list of 2026.
