= Odakyu 3000 series =

Electric multiple unit of Odakyu Electric Railway

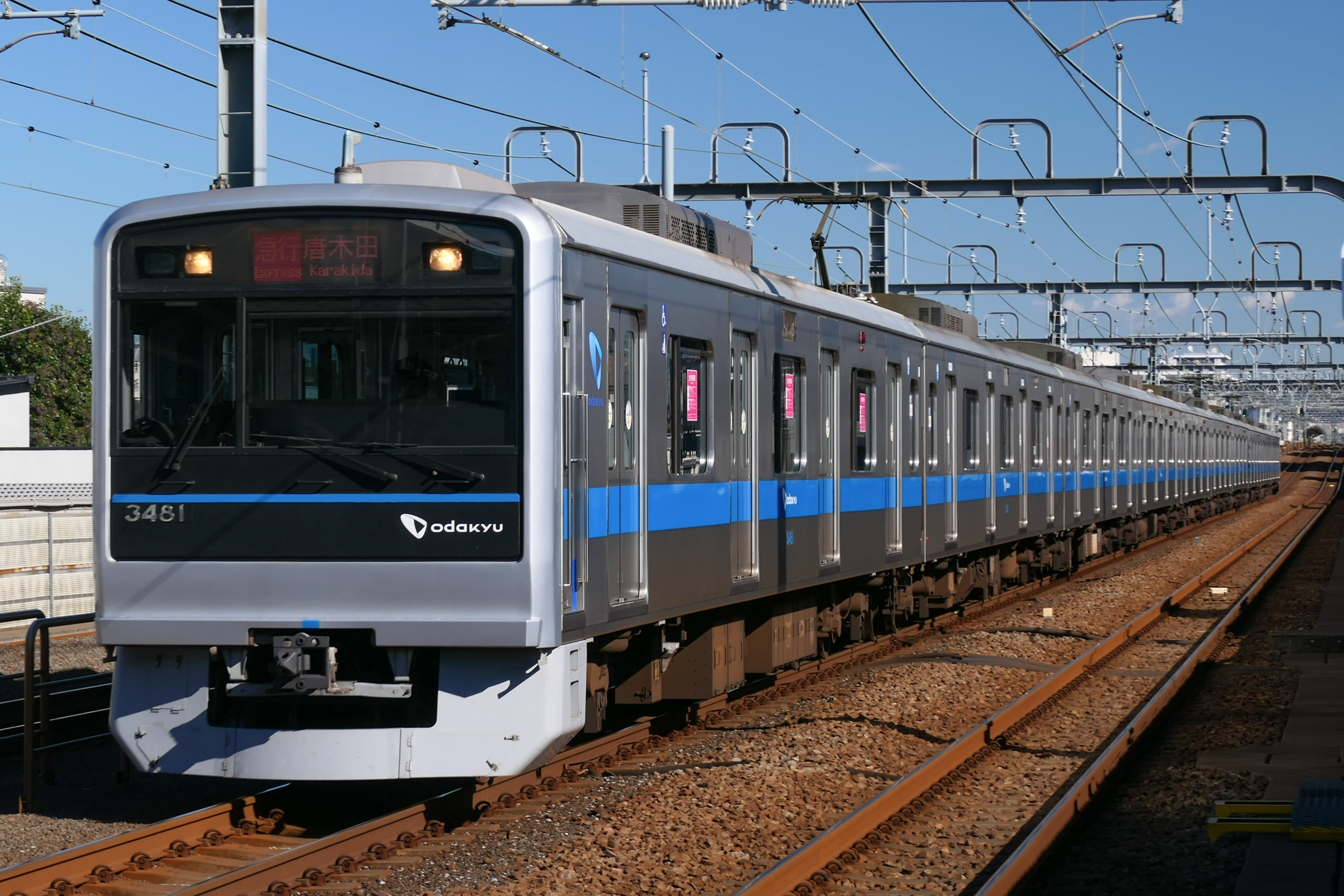
- 10-car set 3081 in November 2021
- Manufacturers: Kawasaki Heavy Industries, Nippon Sharyo, Tokyu Car Corporation
- Constructed: 2001–
- Entered service: 10 February 2002
- Refurbished: 2022–
- Number built: 336 vehicles (47 sets) (as of January 2019)
- Number in service: 336 vehicles (47 sets) (as of January 2019)
- Formation: 6/8/10-car sets
- Operator: Odakyu
- Depot: Ebina

Specifications
- Car body construction: Stainless steel
- Car length: 20,000 mm (65 ft 7 in)
- Doors: 4 pairs per side
- Maximum speed: 100 km/h (62 mph)
- Traction system: Variable frequency (IGBT)
- Acceleration: 3.3 km/(h⋅s) (2.1 mph/s)
- Electric systems: 1,500 V DC overhead lines
- Current collection: Pantograph
- Safety system: OM-ATS
- Multiple working: Odakyu 8000 series, Odakyu 1000 series
- Track gauge: 1,067 mm (3 ft 6 in)

The Odakyu 3000 series (小田急3000形, Odakyū 3000-gata) is an electric multiple unit (EMU) commuter train type operated by the private railway operator Odakyu Electric Railway in Japan. First introduced on 10 February 2002, a total of 336 cars were built with orders divided between Nippon Sharyo, Tokyu Car Corporation, and Kawasaki Heavy Industries. Originally formed as six- and eight-car trainsets, additional cars have been built since 2010 to augment pre-existing sets to ten cars.

== Formations ==
=== 10-car sets ===
The 10-car sets, numbered 3081 to 3095, are formed as follows.

Designation	Tc1	M1	M2	T1	T2	M3	M4	T3	M5	Tc2
Numbering	3050	3000	3100	3150	3250	3200	3300	3350	3400	3450

The M1, T1, M3, and M5 cars each have one single-arm pantograph.

=== 8-car sets 3651–3665 ===
Designation	Tc1	M1	M2	T1	T2	M3	M4	Tc2
Numbering	3650	3600	3700	3750	3850	3800	3900	3950

The M1, T1, and M3 cars each have one single-arm pantograph.

=== 6-car sets 3251–3262 ===
Designation	Tc1	M1	M2	M3	M4	Tc2
Numbering	3250	3200	3300	3400	3500	3550

The M1 and M3 cars each have one single-arm pantograph. Sets 3252 to 3254 have wider doors.

=== 6-car sets 3263–3282 ===
Designation	Tc1	M1	M2	T	M3	Tc2
Numbering	3250	3200	3300	3350	3400	3450

The M1 and M3 cars each have one single-arm pantograph.

== Interior ==
Passenger accommodation consists of longitudinal bench seating throughout.

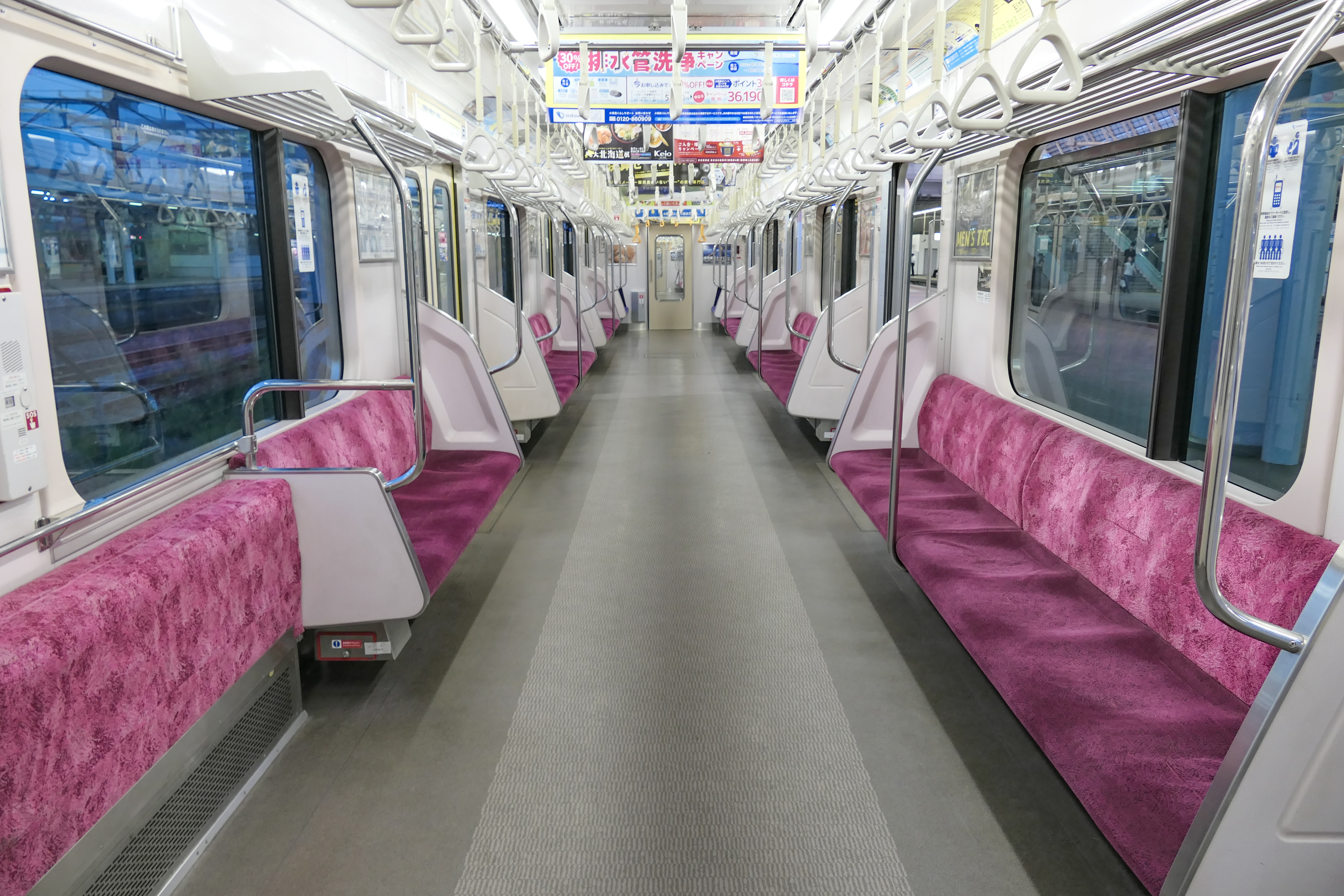
Interior

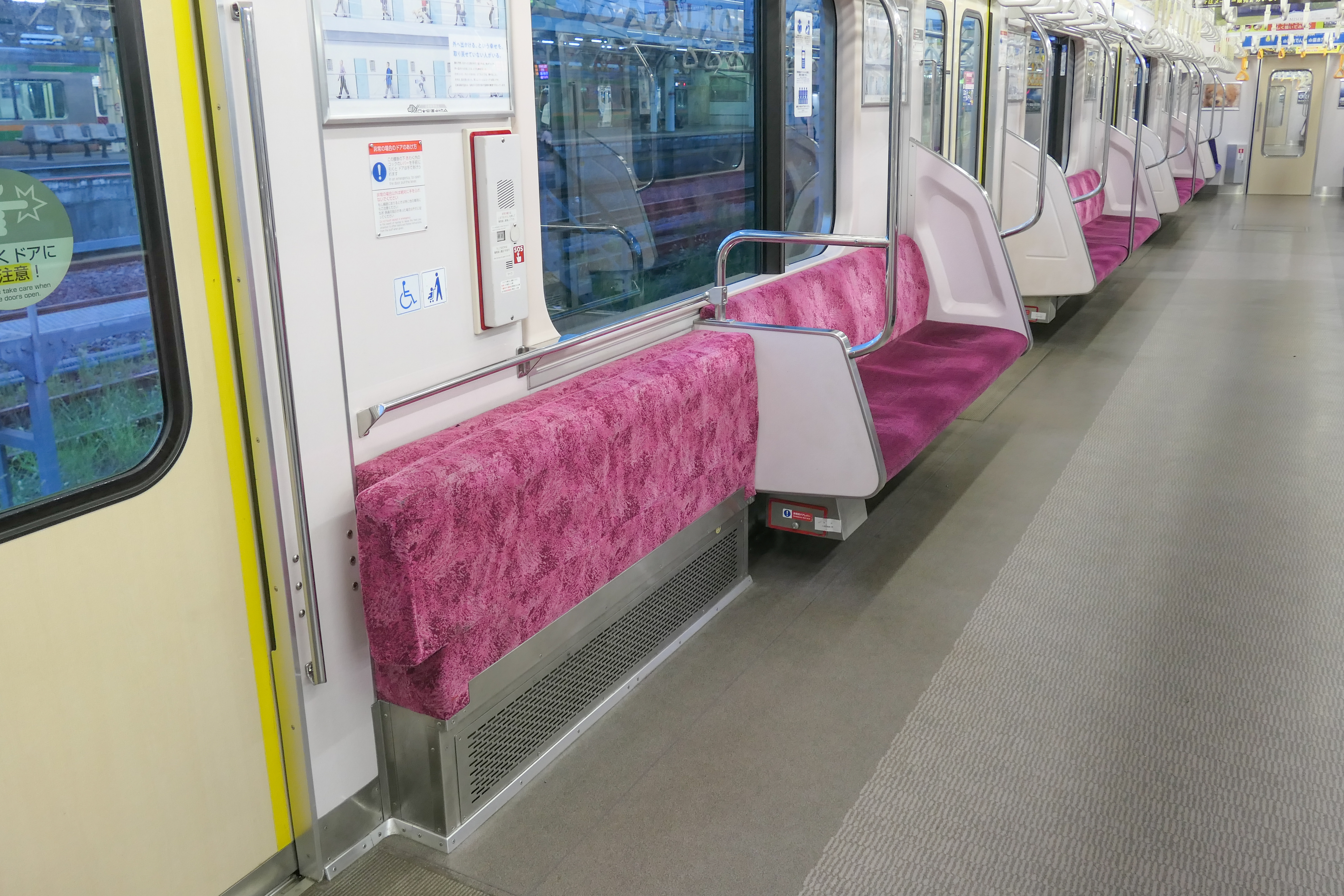
Folding seat

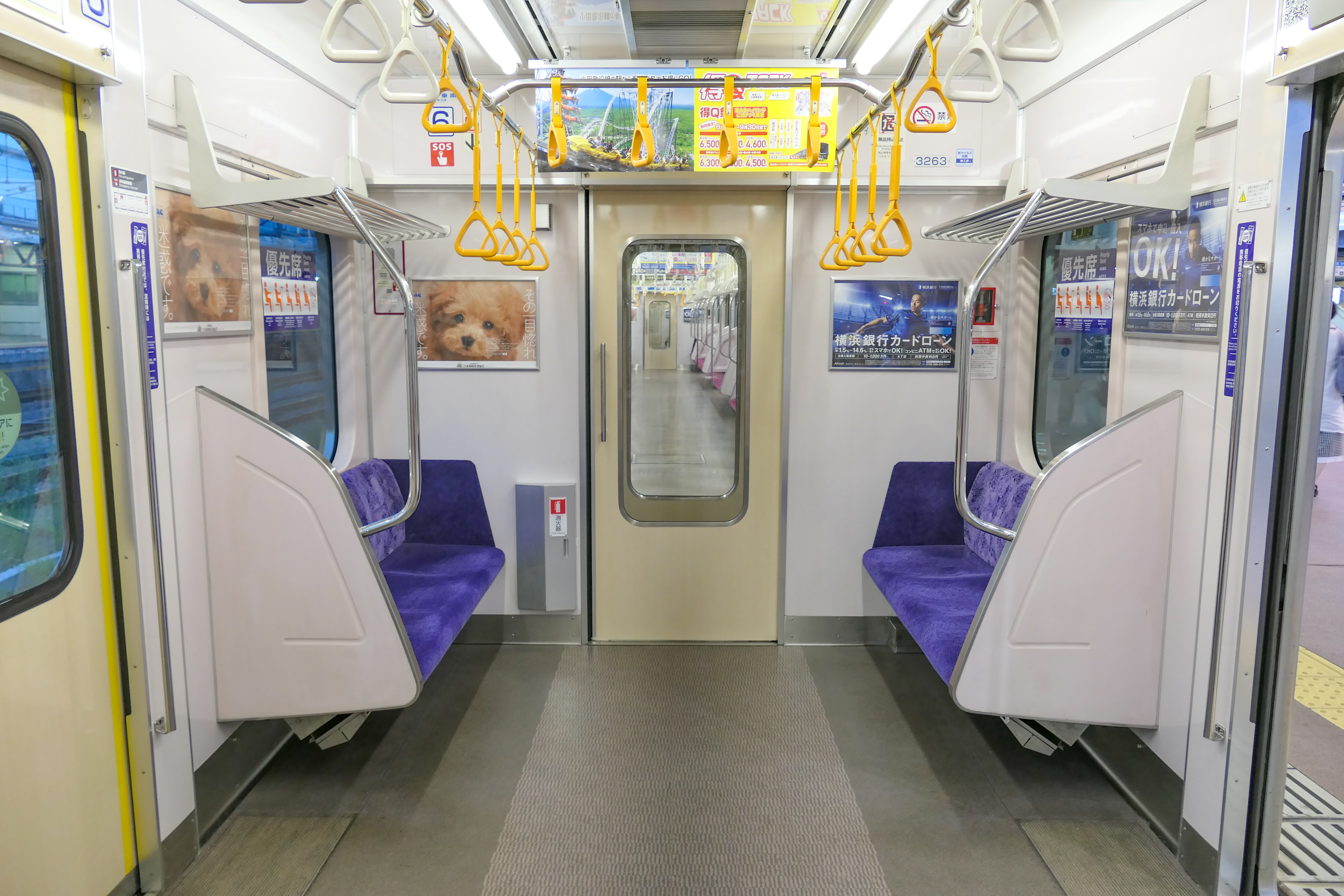
Priority seat

== Operational history ==
The 3000 series entered service on 10 February 2002.

=== 10-car set introduction ===
In 2010, Odakyu announced plans to procure eight cars to extend six-car sets to 10-car sets. These cars were delivered between 2010 and 2011 from Kawasaki Heavy Industries' Hyogo plant and used to augment six-car sets 3280 and 3281 to 10 cars; the sets were renumbered 3091 and 3092, respectively. The first 10-car set, 3091, entered service on 20 January 2011.

As of January 2019, five additional 10-car sets have since been introduced: 3081, 3082 (formerly eight-car sets 3665 and 3664, respectively), and 3093–3095 (formerly six-car sets 3282, 3278, and 3279, respectively).

=== Refurbishment ===
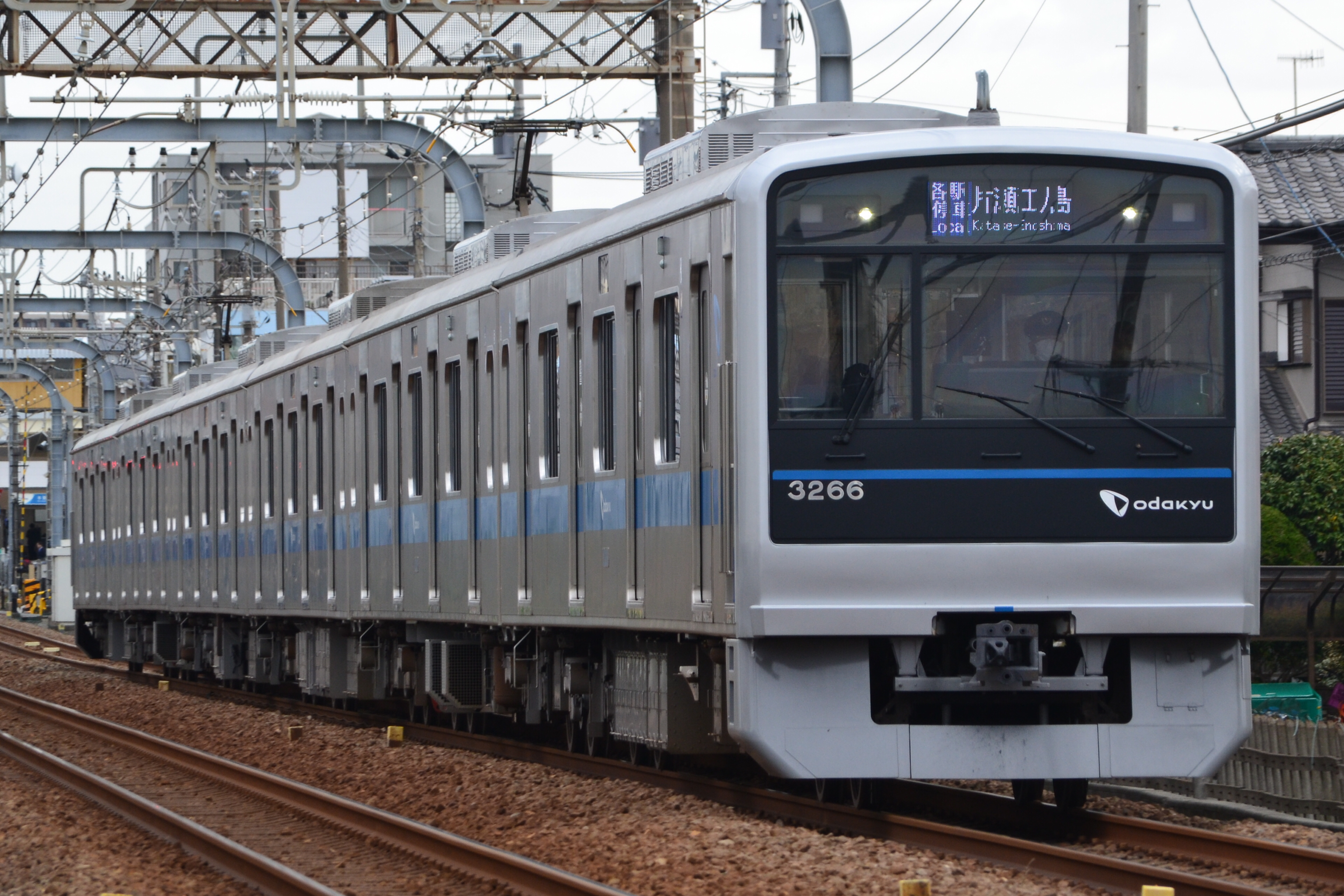
Refurbished set 3266 in March 2023

Beginning in fiscal 2022, the 3000 series has undergone a programme of refurbishment, which includes additional wheelchair spaces, surveillance cameras, and energy-saving control equipment.

== Livery variations ==
=== Doraemon-liveried "F-Train" ===
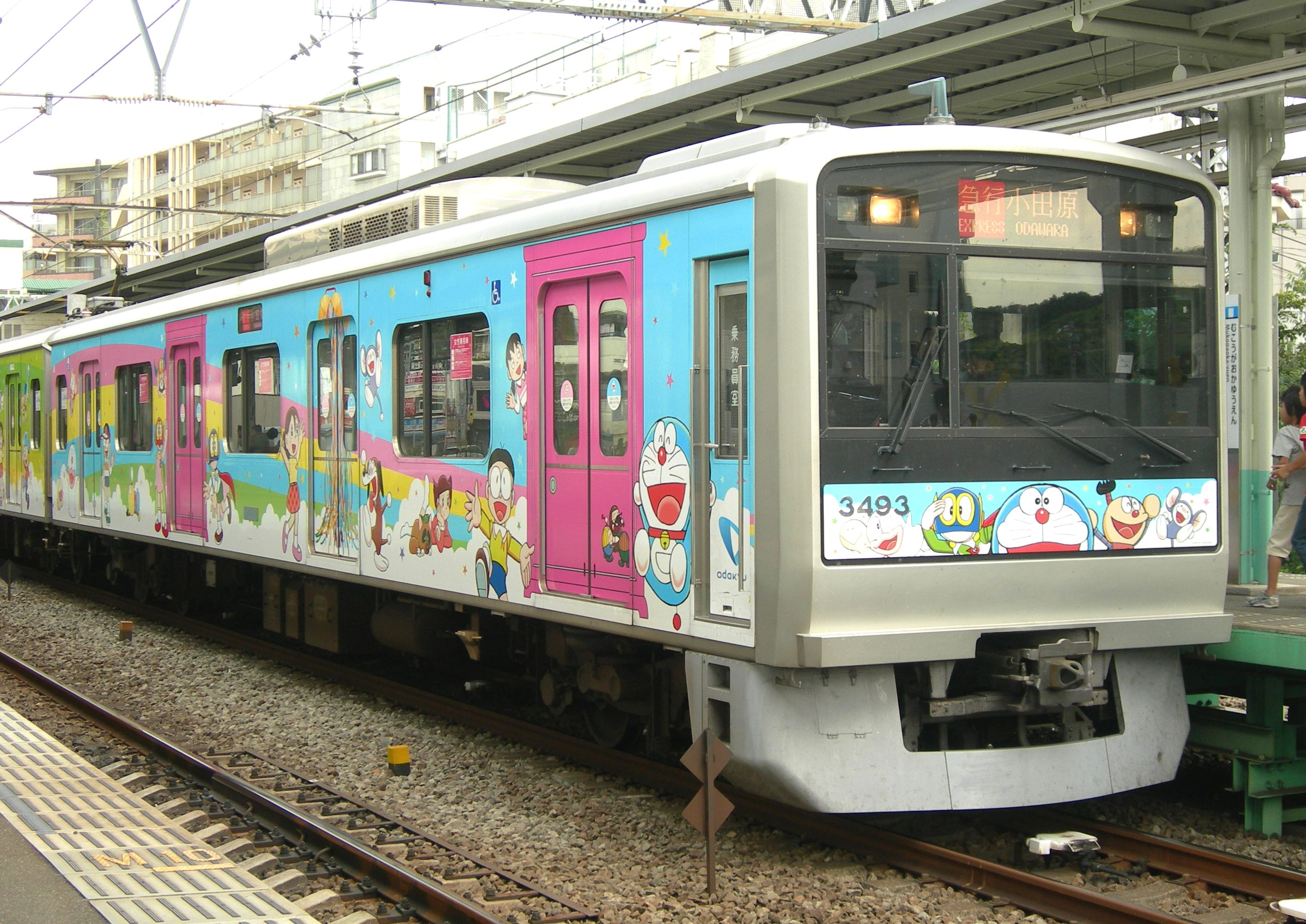
Set 3093 in Doraemon livery in September 2011

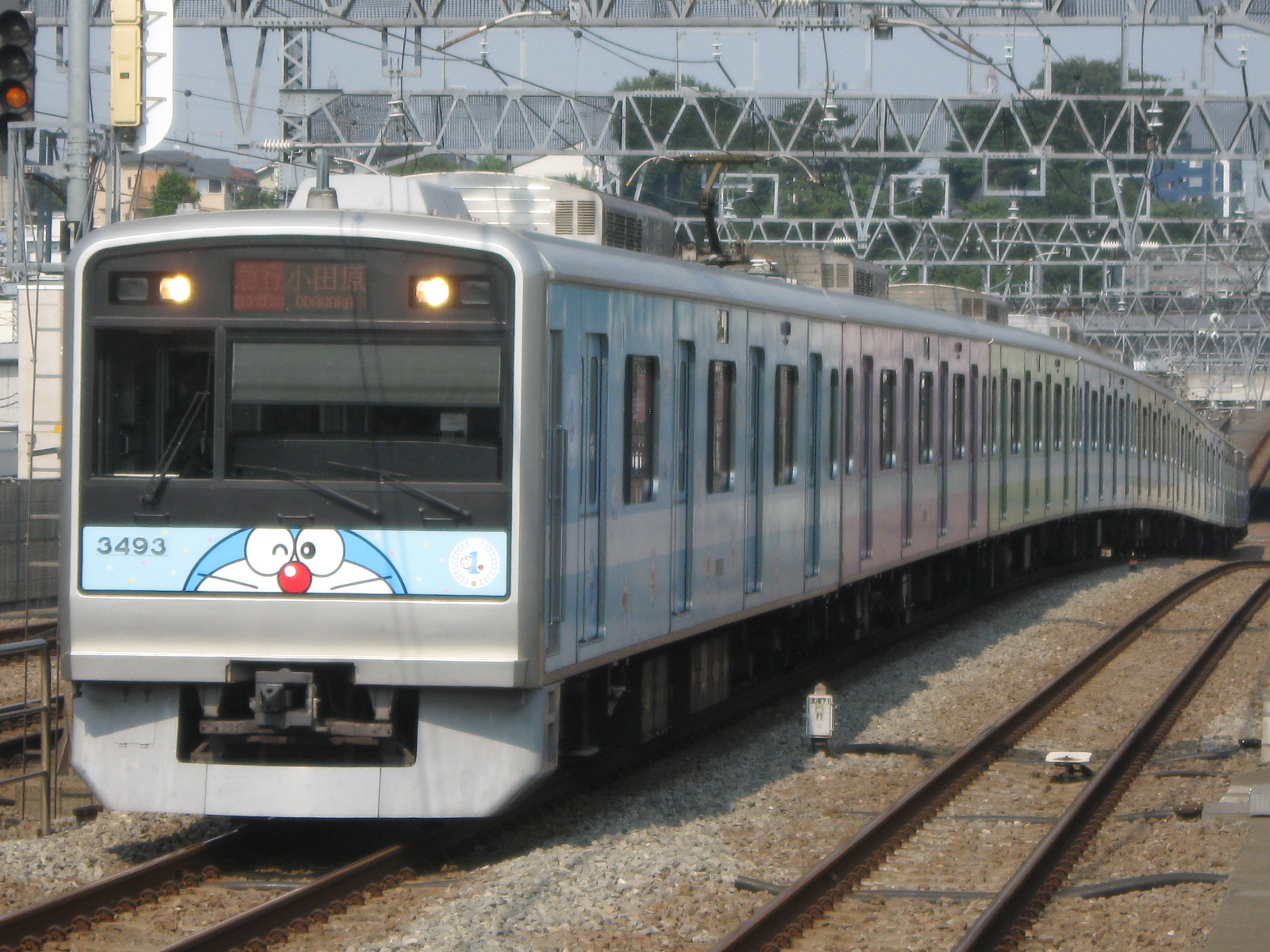
Set 3093 in redesigned Doraemon livery in August 2012

In August 2011, 10-car set 3093 was reliveried in a Doraemon livery to commemorate the opening of the Fujiko F. Fujio Museum in Kawasaki, Kanagawa. The train was scheduled to run in its livery for one year, but this was cut short due to complaints from the Tokyo Metropolitan Government that it violated metropolitan ordinances regulating advertising on train exteriors. The decorated "F-Train" remained in service until 30 September 2011, before the exterior advertising was removed.

Set 3093 returned to service with a redesigned Doraemon livery, named "F-Train II", on 20 July 2012. It was scheduled to carry this livery until 22 March 2013.
