= Meitetsu 1700 series =

Japanese train type

Meitetsu 1700/2300 series
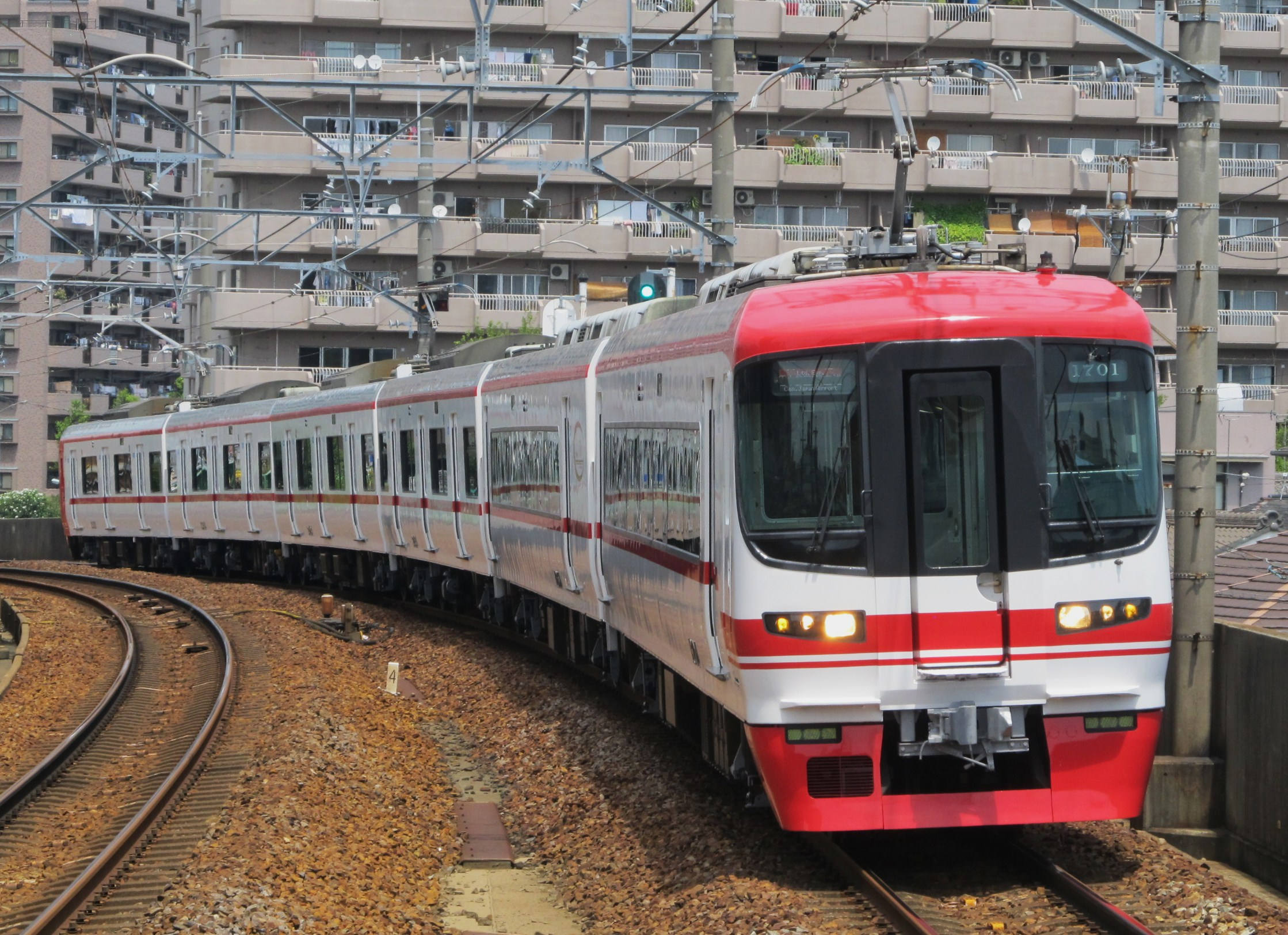
- Reliveried set 1701 in August 2015
- In service: 2008–2021 (1700 series); 2008–Present (2300 series)
- Manufacturer: Nippon Sharyo
- Constructed: 1999 (as 1600 series); 2008 (2300 series)
- Entered service: 27 December 2008
- Refurbished: 2008 (converted from 1600 series)
- Scrapped: 2020–2021 (1700 series)
- Number built: 24 vehicles (4 sets)
- Number in service: None (all commuter cars transferred to 2200 series fleet)
- Number scrapped: 8 vehicles (all 1700 series vehicles)
- Successor: 2200 series
- Formation: 6 cars per trainset
- Fleet numbers: 1701–1704
- Capacity: 263 seated + 321 standing
- Operator: Meitetsu

Specifications
- Car length: 19,750 mm (64 ft 10 in) (1700 series end cars); 19,000 mm (62 ft 4 in) (1700 series intermediate cars); 18,230 mm (59 ft 10 in) (2300 series intermediate cars); 18,115 mm (59 ft 5.2 in) (2300 series end cars)
- Width: 2.7 m (8 ft 10 in)
- Doors: 2/3 pairs per side
- Maximum speed: 120 km/h (75 mph)
- Traction system: Variable frequency
- Acceleration: 2.3 km/(h⋅s) (1.4 mph/s)
- Deceleration: 3.5 km/(h⋅s) (2.2 mph/s) (service); 4.2 km/(h⋅s) (2.6 mph/s) (emergency)
- Electric system: 1,500 V DC overhead
- Current collection: PT7118-B single-arm pantograph
- Safety system: Meitetsu ATS
- Track gauge: 1,067 mm (3 ft 6 in)

The Meitetsu 1700/2300 series (名鉄1700・2300系) was an electric multiple unit (EMU) train type operated by the private railway operator Nagoya Railroad (Meitetsu) in Japan from December 2008 until 2021.

== Formation ==
The fleet consisted of four 6-car sets, formed as follows.

Car No.	1	2	3	4	5	6
Designation	Mc1	T1	T2	M	T2'	Mc2
Numbering	Mo 1700	Sa 1650	Sa 2400	Mo 2450	Sa 2350	Mo 2300
Weight (t)	41.9	32.5	27.5	36.2	28.1	37.8
Capacity Total/seated	48	45	126/44	126/44	126/44	113/38

Cars 1, 4, and 6 each had a single-arm pantograph.

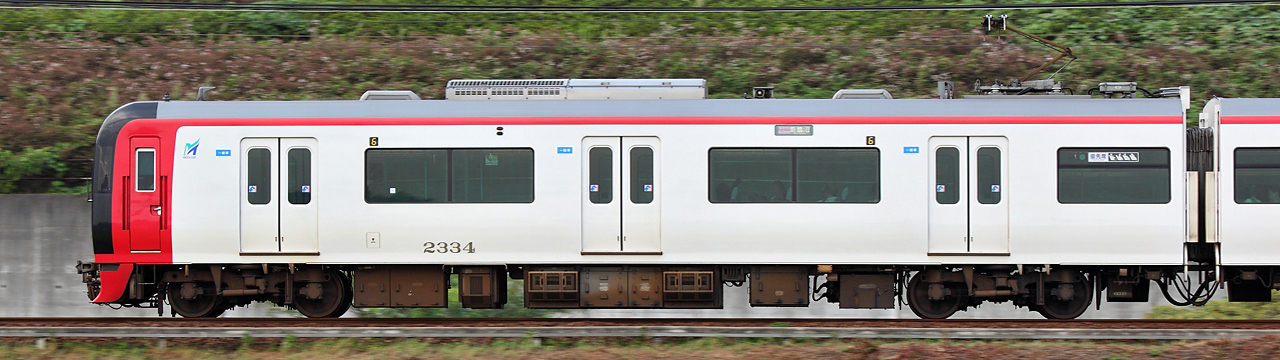
2334 (car 6), August 2009

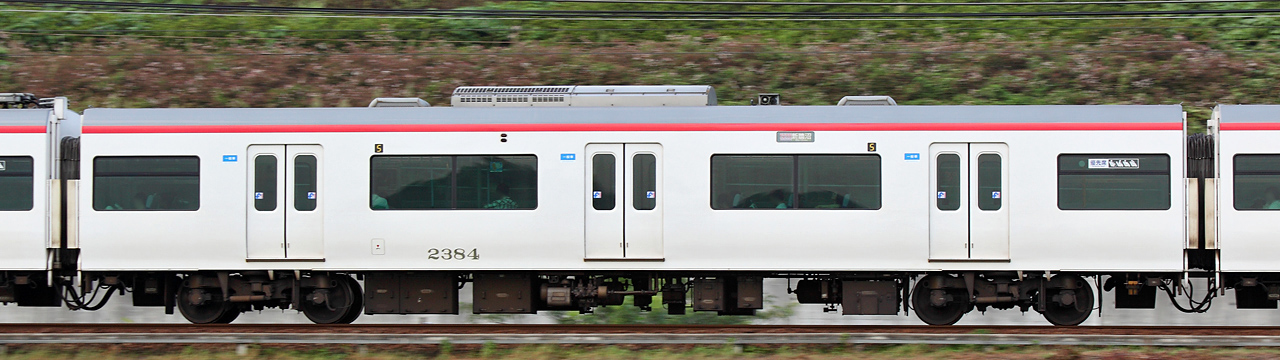
2384 (car 5), August 2009

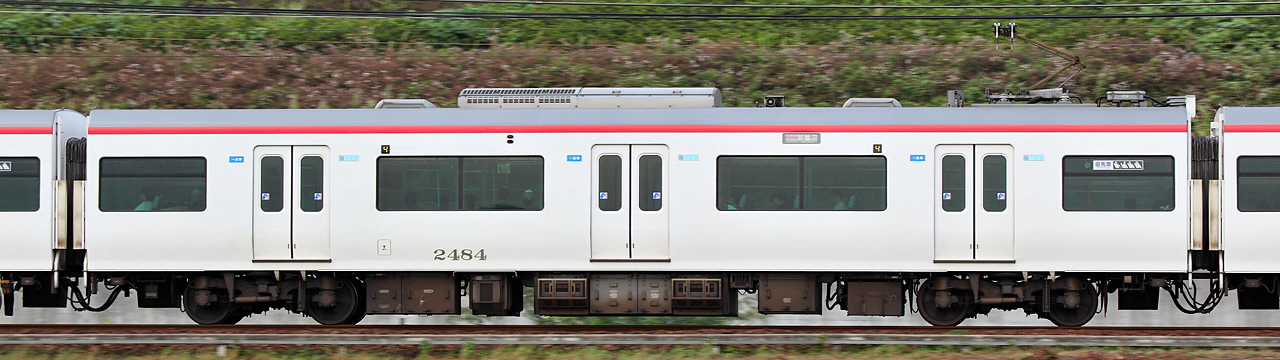
2484 (car 4), August 2009

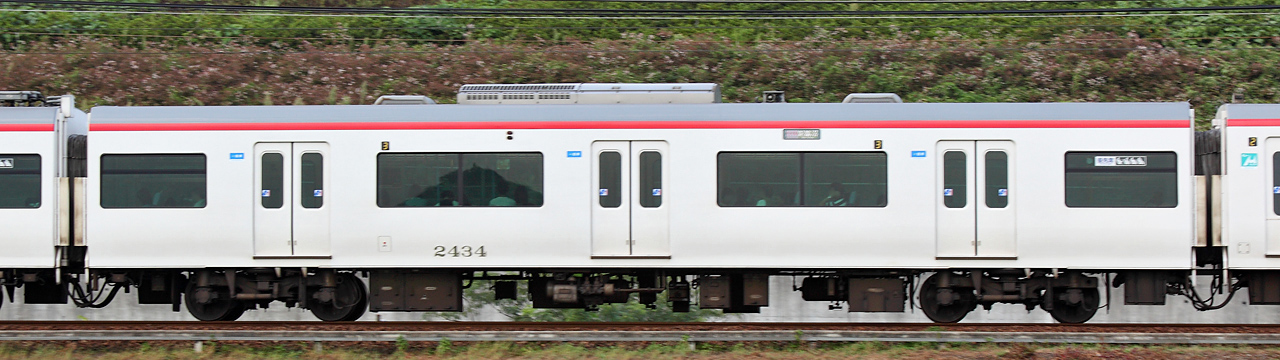
2434 (car 3), August 2009

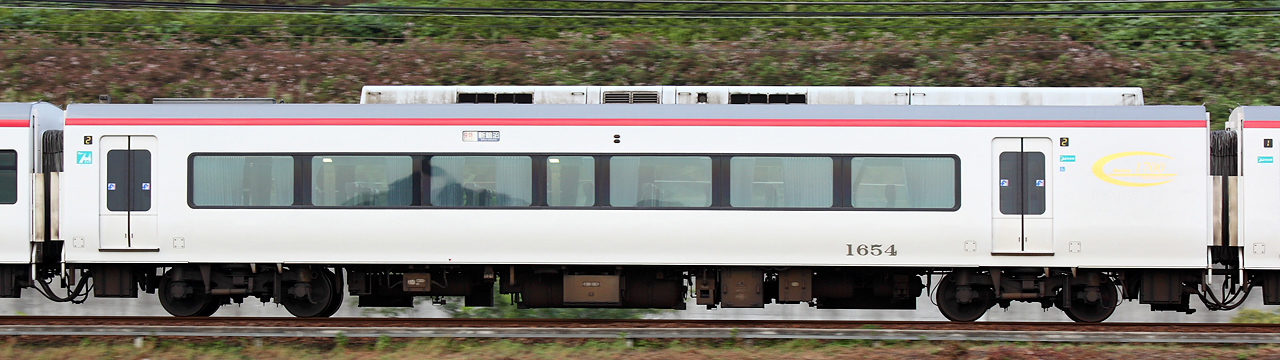
1654 (car 2), August 2009

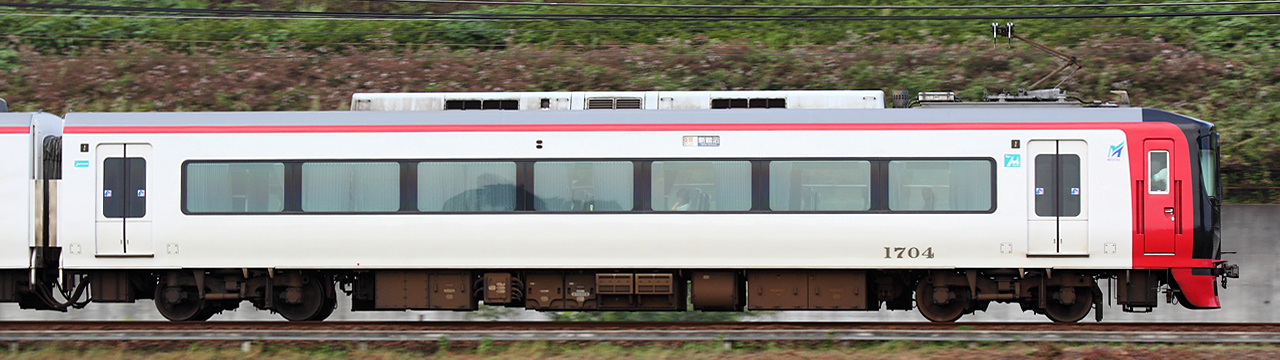
1704 (car 1), August 2009

== Interior ==
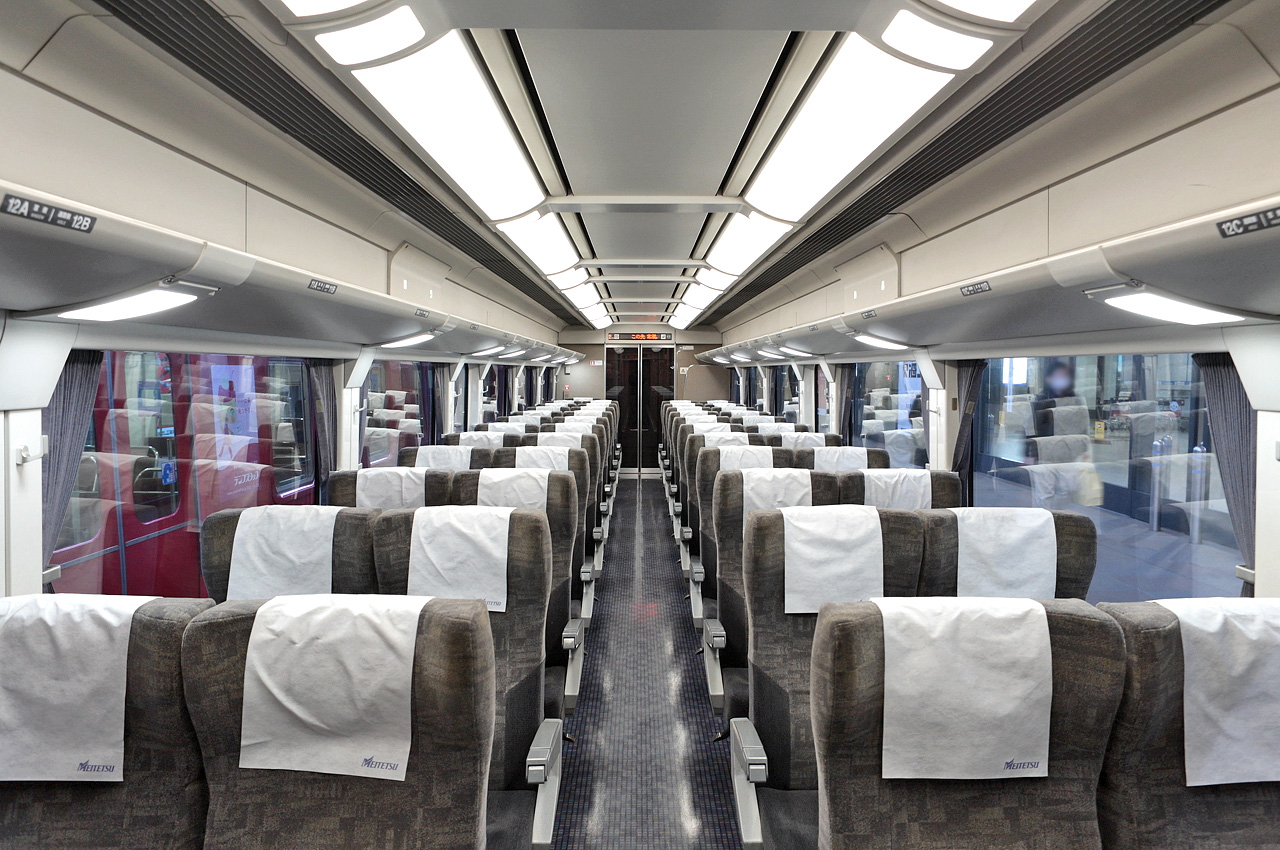
Interior of Sa 1650 car showing limited express style seating configuration

== History ==
The six-car trainsets were formed in 2008 by combining two cars from former 1600 series limited express EMUs with four newly built 2300 series commuter cars. The trains entered service from the start of the revised timetable on 27 December 2008.

The fleet was reliveried from August 2015, starting with set 1701.

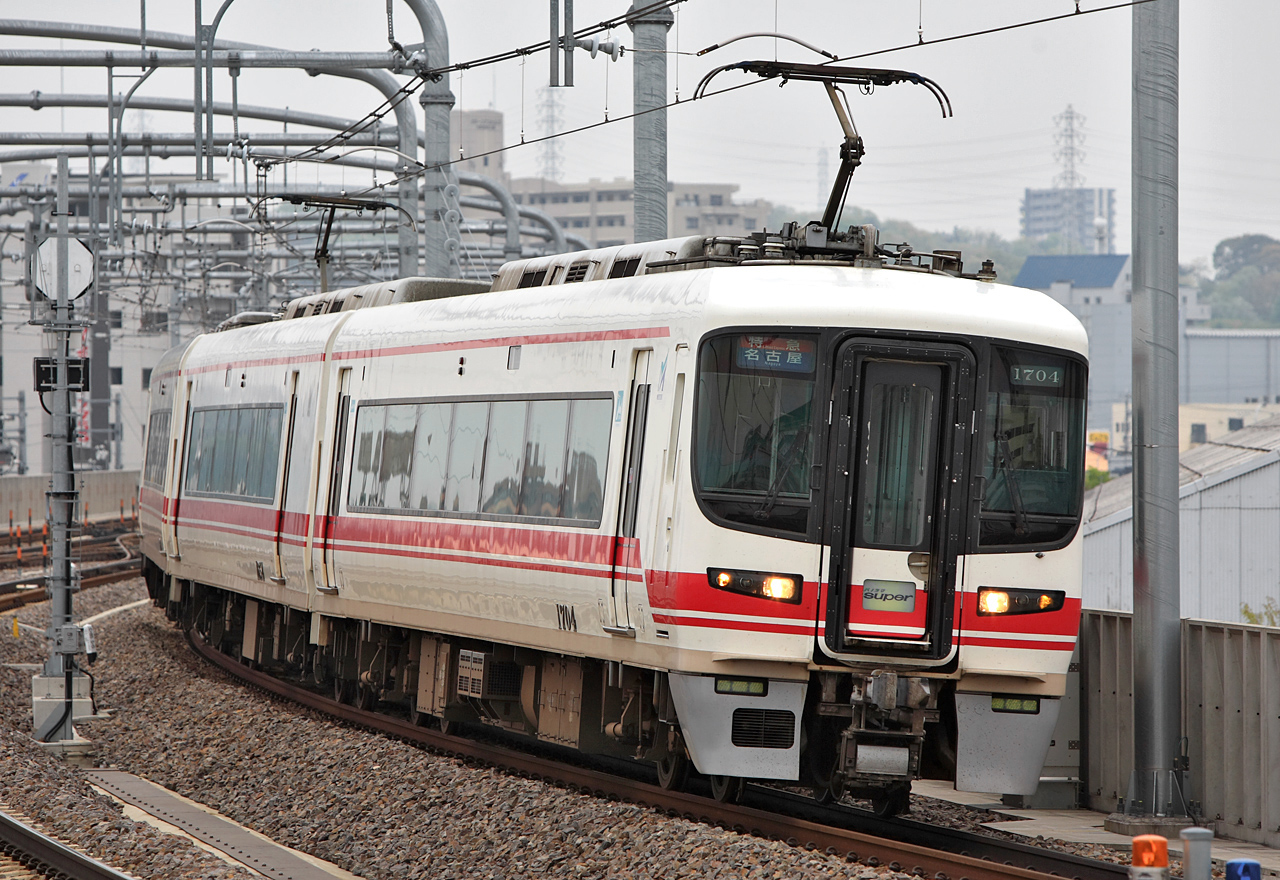
1600 series EMU from which 1700 series cars were modified, April 2008

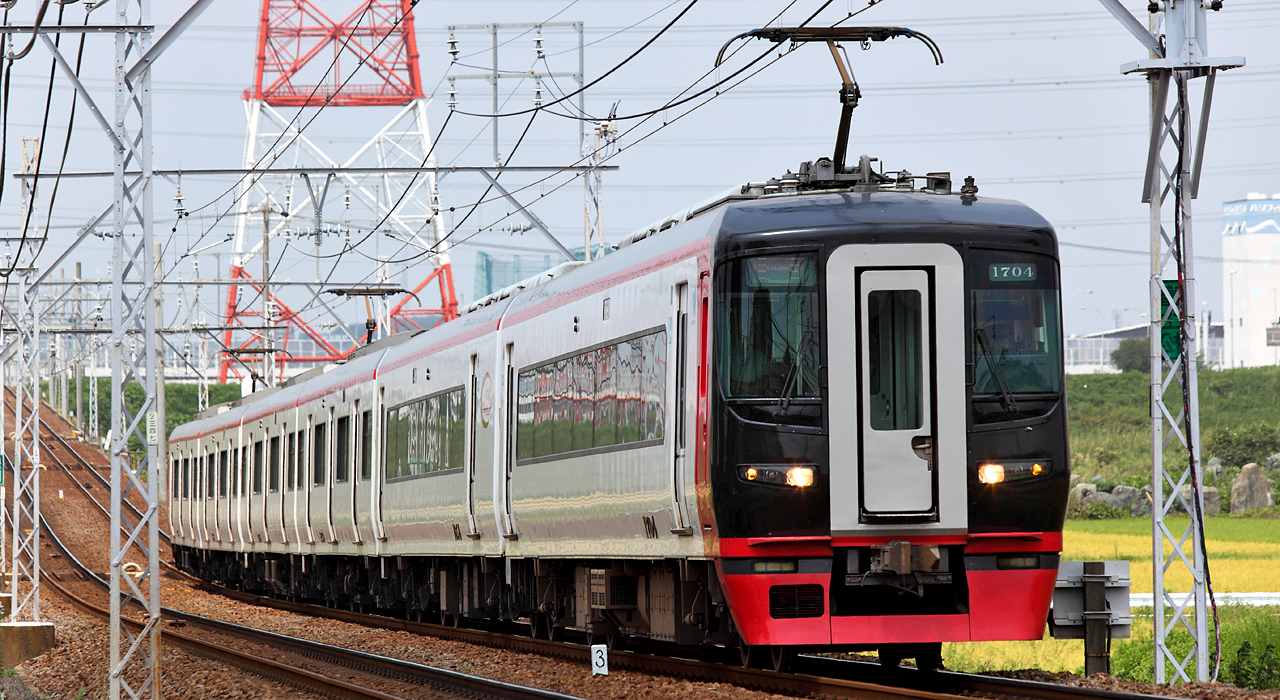
1700/2300 series set 1704 in original livery in August 2009

=== Withdrawal ===
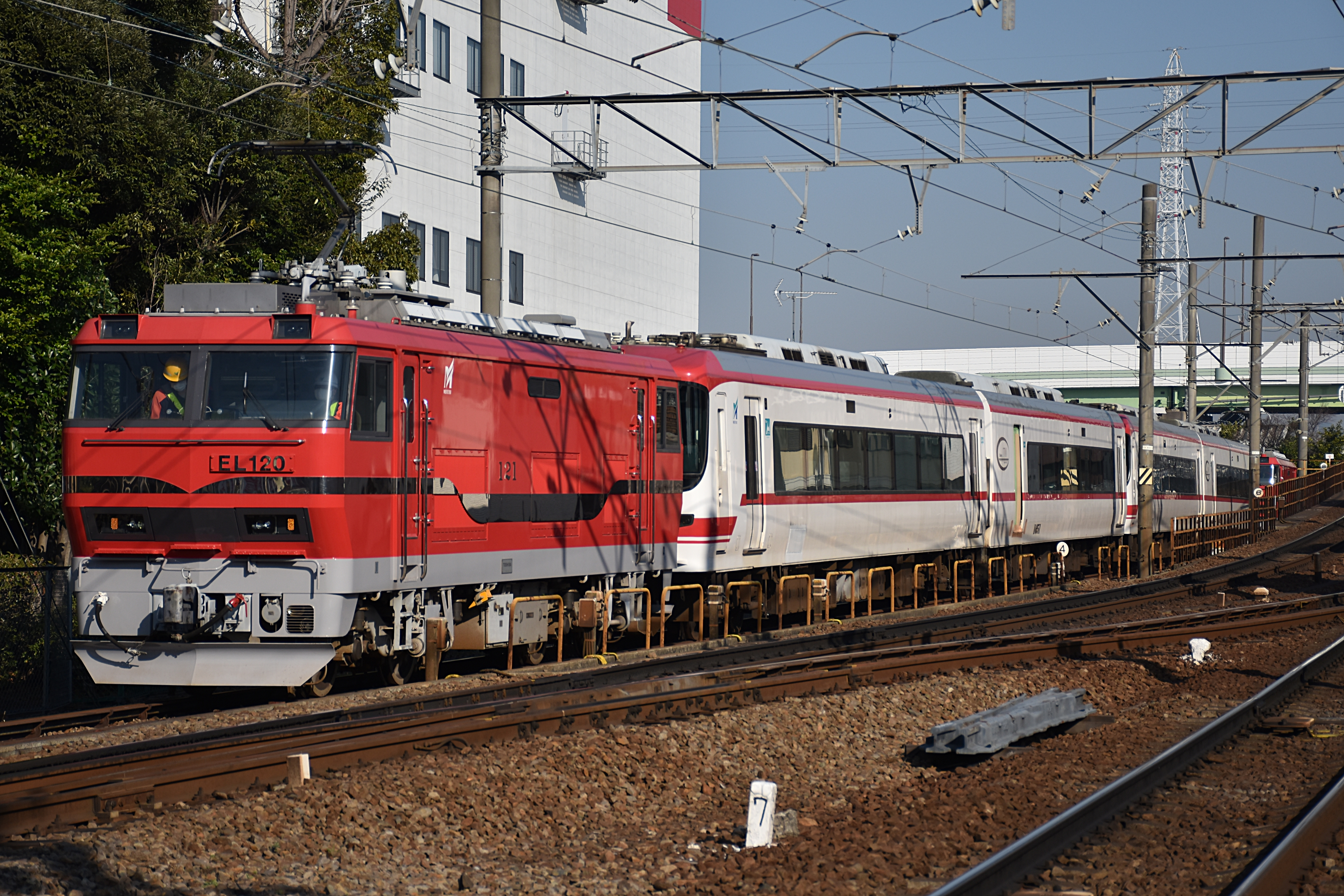
1700 series cars being hauled for scrap in February 2021

Withdrawals of the 1700 series commenced in 2019. The four sets of 2300 series cars were used to form four 2200 series six-car sets. These sets, numbered 2231 to 2234, use two newly built limited express cars and four 2300 series cars originally used with the 1700 series sets. The first of these sets to be formed, 2234, entered service in February 2020, using the 2300 series cars from 1700 series set 1704.

All 1700 series limited express cars were scrapped by February 2021.
