= Meitetsu 1600 series =

Japanese train type

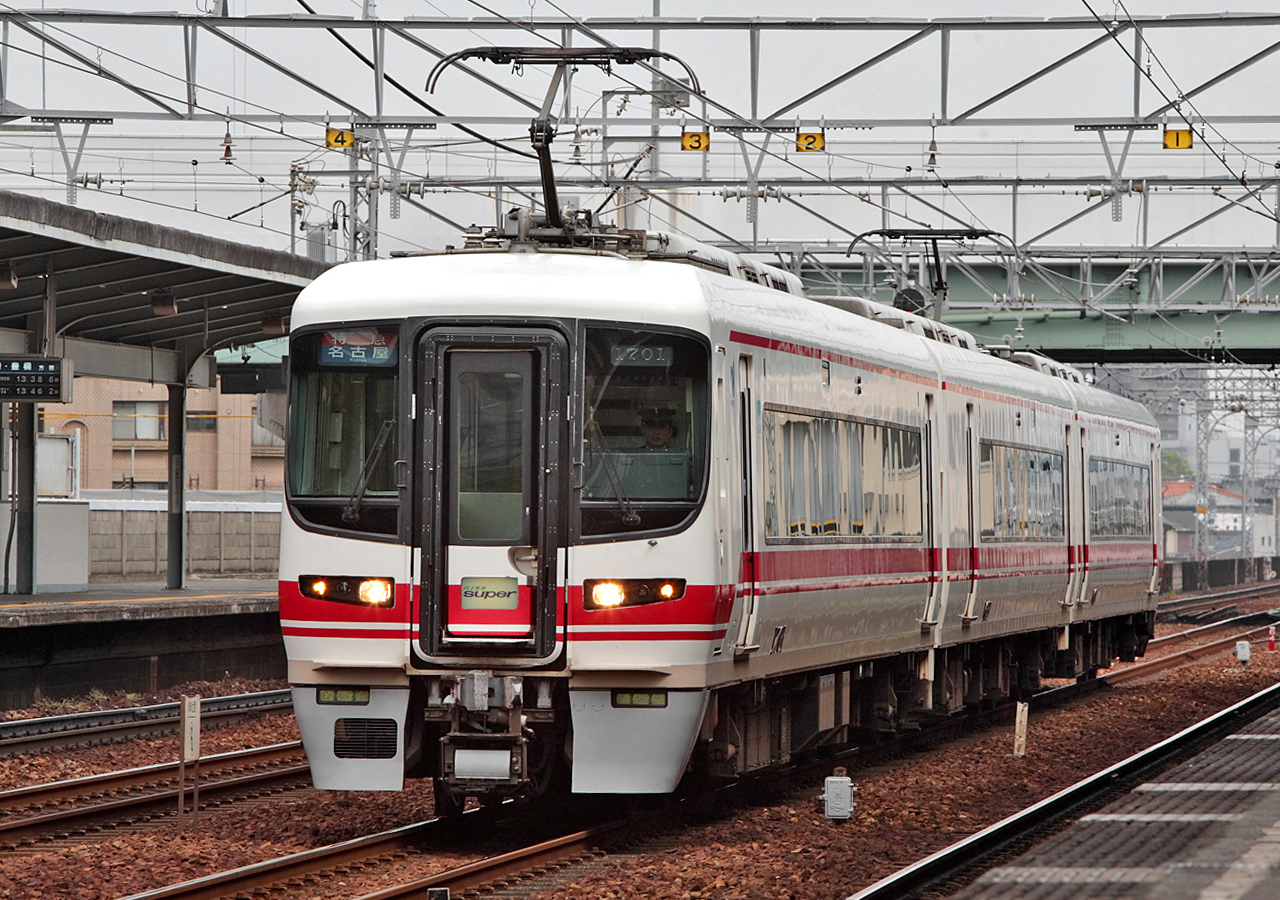
- Set 1601 in 2008
- In service: May 1999 - June 2008
- Manufacturer: Nippon Sharyo
- Family name: Panorama Super
- Constructed: 1999
- Entered service: 10 May 1999
- Scrapped: 2008
- Number built: 12 vehicles (4 sets)
- Number in service: None
- Number scrapped: 4 vehicles (the rest of 8 vehicles were converted to 1700 series)
- Formation: 3 cars per set
- Fleet numbers: 1601–1604
- Operators: Meitetsu

Specifications
- Maximum speed: 120 km/h (75 mph)
- Traction system: Variable frequency (IGBT)
- Electric system(s): 1,500 V DC
- Current collection: Overhead catenary
- Safety system(s): Meitetsu ATS
- Track gauge: 1,067 mm (3 ft 6 in)

The Meitetsu 1600 series (名鉄1600系) was an electric multiple unit (EMU) type operated by the private railway operator Nagoya Railroad (Meitetsu) on limited express services in Japan from May 1999 until June 2008. Two cars from each set were subsequently modified to create the 1700 series EMUs in conjunction with new 2300 series cars.

== Formations ==
The fleet consisted of four three-car sets formed as follows.

Car No.	1	2	3
Designation	Tc	T	Mc
Numbering	Ku 1600	Sa 1650	Mo 1700

Cars 2 and 3 were each fitted with a single-arm pantograph.

== Interior ==
Passenger accommodation consisted of unidirectional seating arranged 2+2 abreast. Car 2 included a toilet and wheelchair space.

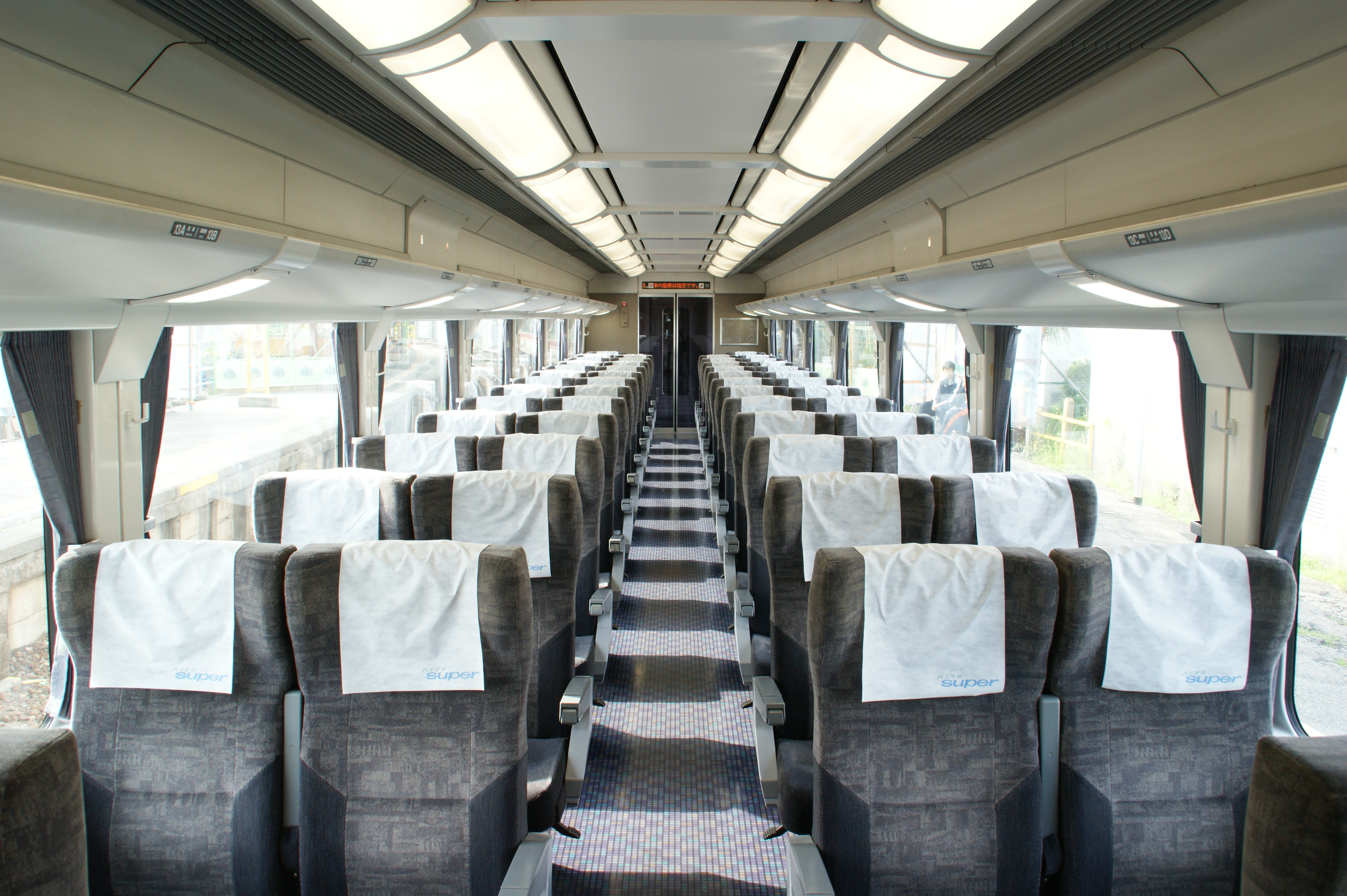
Interior of the 1600 series

== History ==
The trains were introduced on 10 May 1999.
