= Taiwan Railway DR1000 gasoline railcar (first generation) =

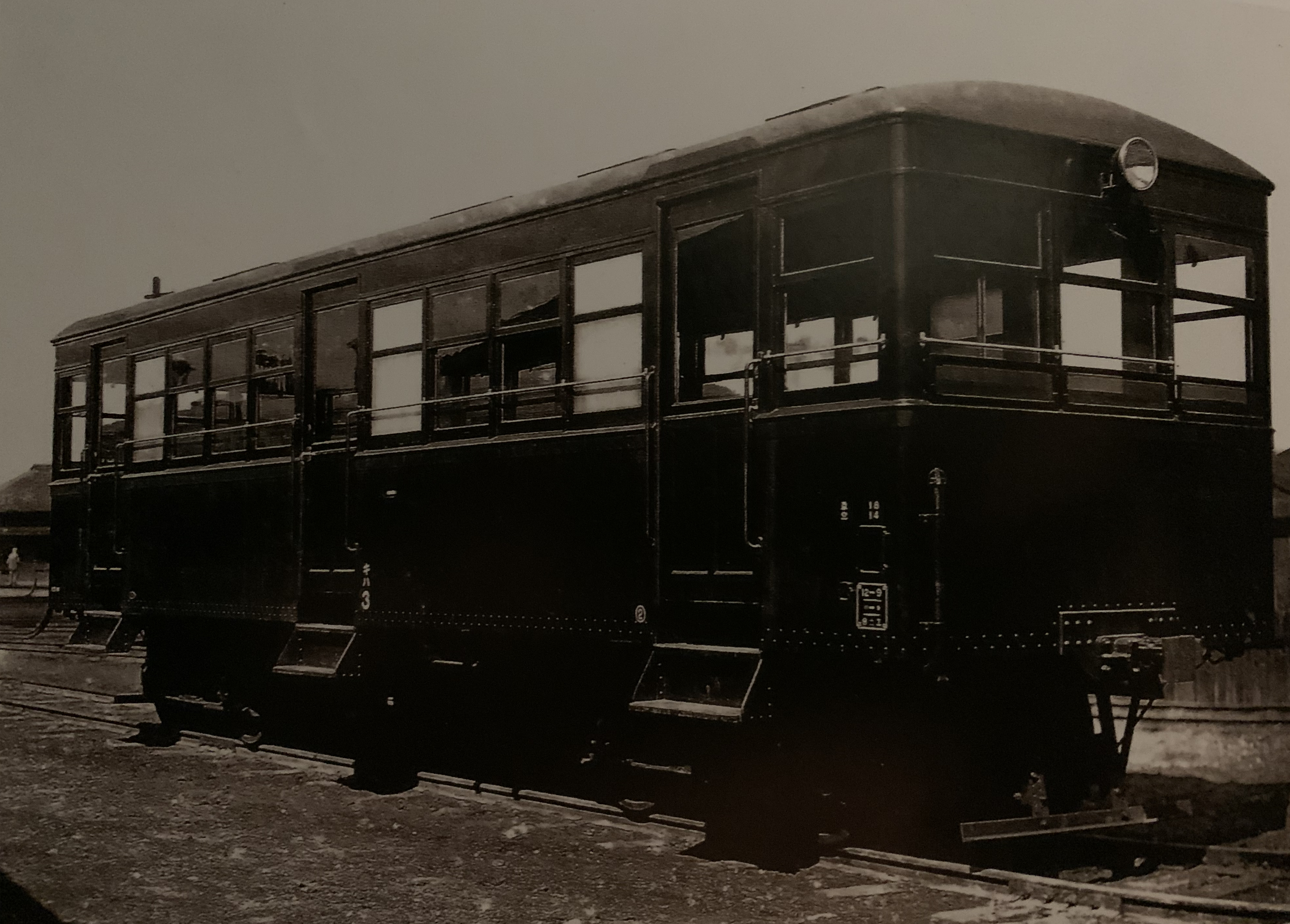
- The gasoline railcar between 1930 and 1945
- In service: 1930-1961
- Manufacturer: Nippon Sharyo
- Constructed: 18DR1000: 1930, 18DR1010: 1931
- Scrapped: 1961
- Number built: 18DR1000: 4 cars, 18DR1010: 7 cars
- Operators: Taiwan Railways Administration

Specifications
- Track gauge: 3 ft 6 in (1,067 mm)

The Taiwan Railway DR1000 gasoline railcar is a railcar used by the Taiwan Railways Administration. This article describes the first generation of the DR1000 units, and also describes the 18DR1010 railcar.

== History and description ==
The initial versions of the 18DR1000 gasoline railcars (also known as Kiha1) were four railcars purchased by the Ministry of Railways of the Taiwan's Governor's Office from Nippon Sharyo in 1930. The vehicles had three windows at each end and ten windows along each side. With three sliding doors, the interior is equipped with bench seating. The units are powered by a 75-horsepower 6-SRL gasoline engine made by Waukesha Engine in the United States. This type of railcar was introduced to compete with the increasing number of passenger automobiles in the metropolitan area. They were designed to reduce the operating cost of trains and to offer increased ride comfort when compared to steam locomotives. The following year, the Ministry of Railways again purchased eight Kiha10 gasoline railcars (キハ10-shaped Kiha bullet cars) from Nippon Sharyo, later designated as the 18DR1010 type. These units had twelve windows and two sliding doors on each side, and the interior seats were arranged in a non-traditional shape. The vehicles had the same power units as those of the Kiha1.

With the introduction of the Kiha1 units, they were assigned to the Keelung Depot, mainly running between Keelung and Taoyuan, and the Kiha10 units were assigned to the Changhua and Kaohsiung depots (in addition to also being assigned to Keelung), running between Taichung and Changhua and between Tainan and Kaohsiung.

After the end of World War II, Taiwan Railways took over the vehicles and renamed the Kiha1 to 18GA1000 (numbered 18GA1001-18GA1004) and renamed the Kiha 10 to 18GA1010 (numbered 18GA1011-18GA1018) small gasoline rail vehicles, of which the Kiha16 unit was scrapped in 1941, leaving unit 18GA1016 absent from the numbering scheme. In 1957, Taiwan Railways changed the naming of the units: the GA (Gasoline) designation was changed to DR (Diesel Rail), and changed the numbers 1018 to 1016, so the 18DR1010 was numbered to 18DR1017. Although the small gasoline railcar was designated as a diesel railcar, it was not equipped with a diesel engine and only used as an unpowered trailer. To conform to the actual usage of the units, Taiwan Railways changed the designation again in 1961 to 18TPK1000 and 18TPK1010 third-class passenger cars, but by this time, the vehicles were old and were either scrapped or dismantled. In addition, there is a record of the 18TPK1000 unit being designated as an 18IC1000 training vehicle, but it was also eventually dismantled.
