= RSR Japanese Pacific locomotives =

Class of Thai steam locomotives

RSR/SRT Japanese Pacific locomotives
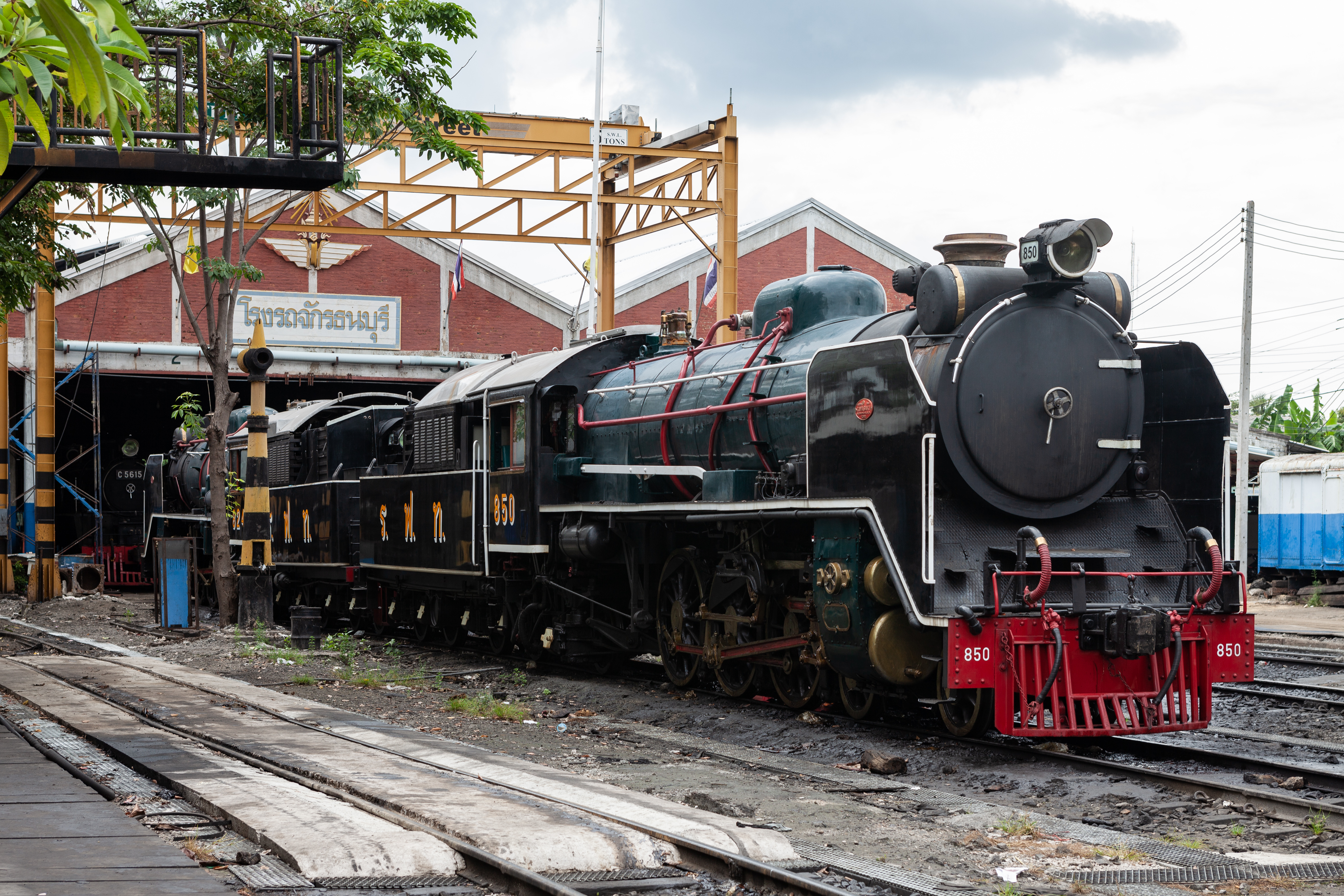
- Preserved locomotives nos. 824 (back) and 850 (front), Thonburi engine shed
Type and origin
- Power type: Steam
- Builder: Hitachi, Kawasaki, Nippon Sharyo
Specifications
- Configuration
  - Whyte: 4-6-2
  - UIC: 2'C1' h2
- Driver: 2nd driving wheel
- Gauge: 1,000 mm (3 ft 3 3/8 in) (Thailand); 1,050 mm (3 ft 5 11/32 in) (Jordan)
- Leading dia.: 762 mm
- Coupled dia.: 1,371 mm (4.498 ft)
- Trailing dia.: 762 mm (2.500 ft)
- Tender wheels: 851 mm (2.792 ft)
- Length
  - Over couplers: 19,335 mm (63.435 ft)
- Width: 2,700 mm (8.9 ft)
- Height: 3,850 mm (12.63 ft)
- Frame type: Bar frames
- Fuel type: Oil; Wood
- Safety valve: Pop
- Cylinders: Two, outside
- Valve gear: Walschaerts, indirect (first batch) and direct (second batch)
- Couplers: ABC couplers, replaced with Janney/MCB couplers (RSR); Centre buffer couplers (JHR)
Career
- Operators: Royal State Railway of Siam (RSR), later State Railway of Thailand (SRT); Jordan Hejaz Railway (JHR)
- Numbers: 283–292; 821–850 (RSR/SRT); 81–85 (JHR)
- Locale: Thailand; Jordan
- Preserved: SRT nos. 824 and 850; JHR nos. 81, 82, 84, and 85
- Disposition: Two preserved, remainder scrapped (Thailand); Four preserved, one scrapped (Jordan)
- Reference(s) (unless where noted)

The Royal State Railway of Siam (RSR, later State Railway of Thailand (SRT)) Japanese Pacific locomotives were a class of 4-6-2 "Pacific" metre gauge steam locomotives manufactured by various Japanese locomotive and rolling stock manufacturers introduced in 1942 for the RSR/SRT. Largely based upon and standardised with the earlier Japanese-built 2-8-2 "Mikado" locomotives of the railway, not all of the first examples were placed in service until after the Second World War. Additional examples were ordered post-war, and these Pacifics continued to see service up to the end of steam traction in Thailand. Two locomotives, nos. 824 and 850, are preserved in working order at Thonburi engine shed to haul special trains.

== History ==
During the Second World War, the first 10 locomotives which comprised the first batch of the class were delivered in 1942. These locomotives, similar to earlier 2-8-2 locomotives built and delivered by Hitachi and Nippon Sharyo, obtained running numbers 283–292 and were also built by the aforementioned companies. However, not all of these locomotives could not be put in service until after the war.

After the war, more of these Pacifics were procured by the railway in 1949, considered as war reparations. At that time, the Thai railways experienced an increase in traffic, and an initial batch of 10 Pacifics was amended to include 20 more in response. The last two of these Pacifics, 849–850, would be converted to burn oil at the Makkasan engine works just after delivery, in contrast to burning wood. This conversion was done to trial oil burning on the steam fleet of the Thai railways. Progressively, more wood-burning Pacifics were given conversions to oil-burning, but the 1973 oil crisis resulted in these engines being reverted to wood-burning again.

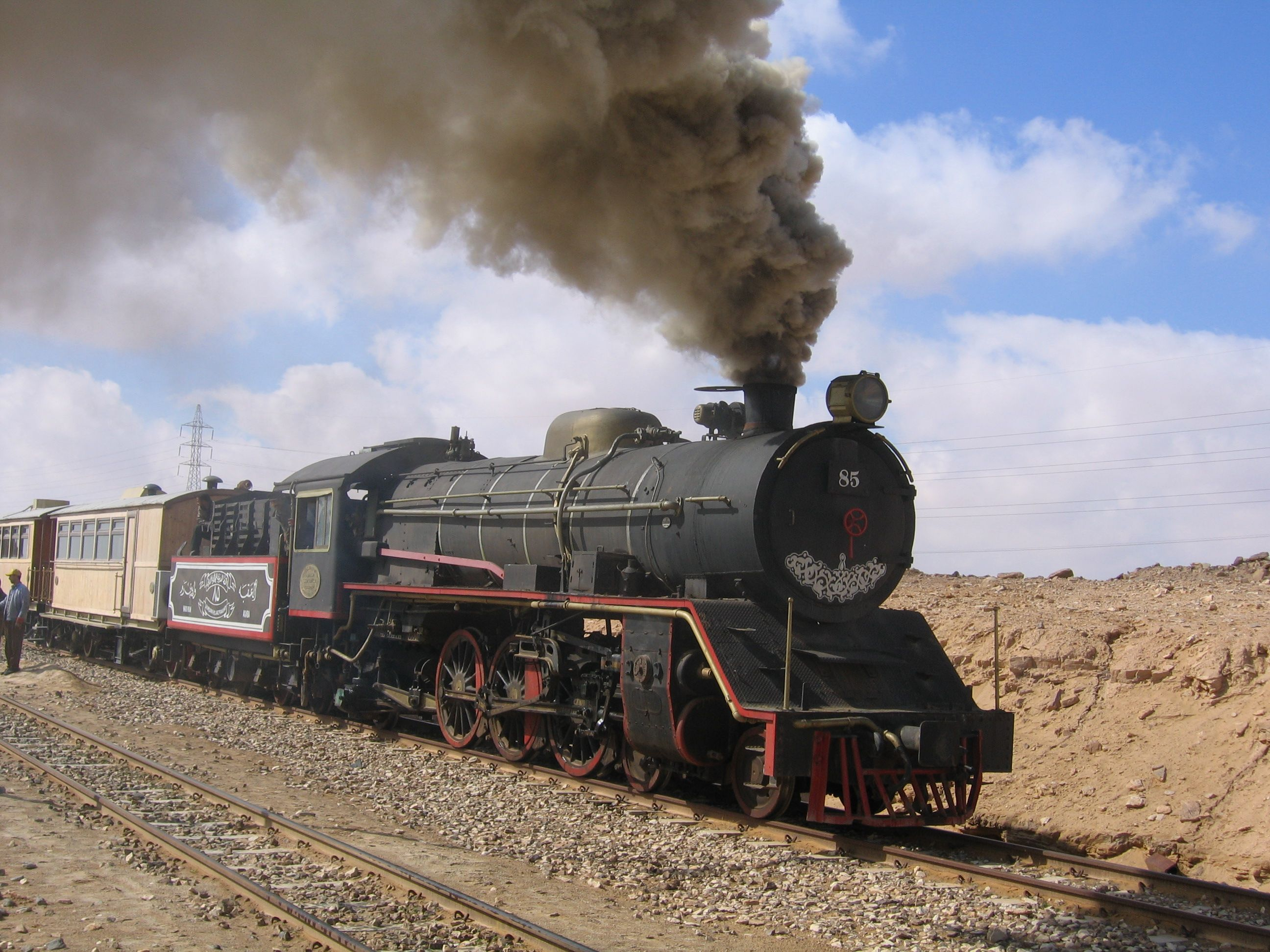
Jordan Hedjaz Rail (HJR) 85 hauling a train. The train was intended for Thailand but never delivered and was sent to Jordan instead.

A batch of five Pacifics built by Nippon for the railway in 1953 were built, but never sent to Thailand, where they would be allocated to the Jordan Hejaz Railway (JHR) after gauge conversion to 1050mm gauge and renumbering to nos. 81–85.

The slow dieselisation of the Thai railways eventually resulted in the gradual withdrawal and scrapping of the steam fleet. In 1975, 15 of these engines were put up on sale to the Bangladesh Railway; however the sale never happened, and by 1976, only 13 of these engines remained rostered on the SRT. Steam was withdrawn from the SRT in 1982 and by 1983, only two were left.

== Preservation ==
Pacifics nos. 824 (Nippon Sharyo 1524/1949) (Note: Ramaer (2009) seems to place the sequence of the works numbers from this specific batch in doubt; it is given as 1525/1949.) and 850 (Nippon 1547/1950) of the second batch are preserved in working order by the SRT at the Thonburi engine shed. They are used on special trains chartered on six days of the year. These locomotives had their boilers replaced with newly fabricated boilers in 2012.

Nos. 81 and 82 are preserved and stabled at Amman. No. 83 has been scrapped. No. 84 is on display at the University of Jordan in Amman, and No. 85 is stabled at Wadi Rum. Nos. 81 and 85 of the JHR were in steam as recently as 2022.

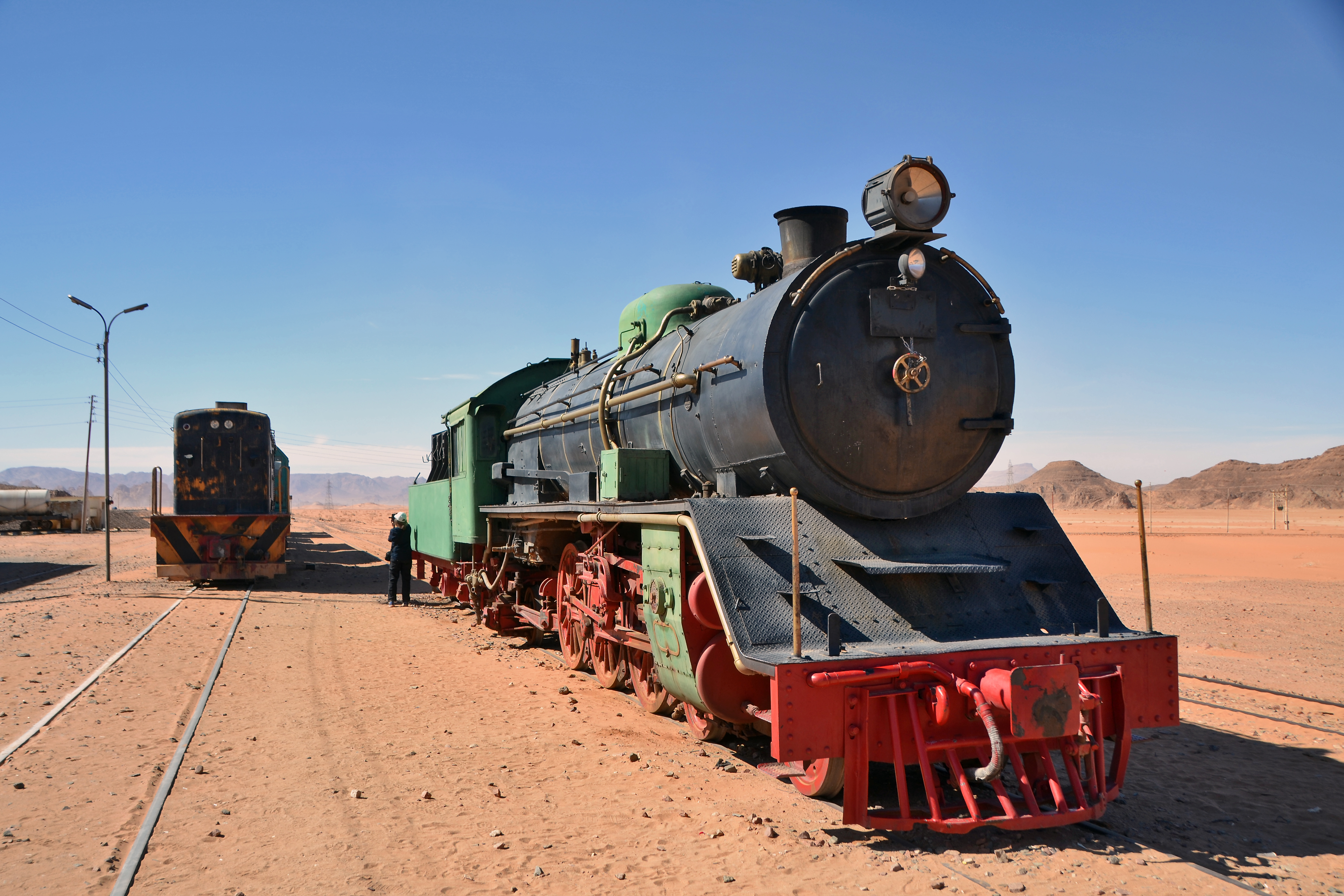
JHR 85 stabled at Wadi Rum

== Design ==
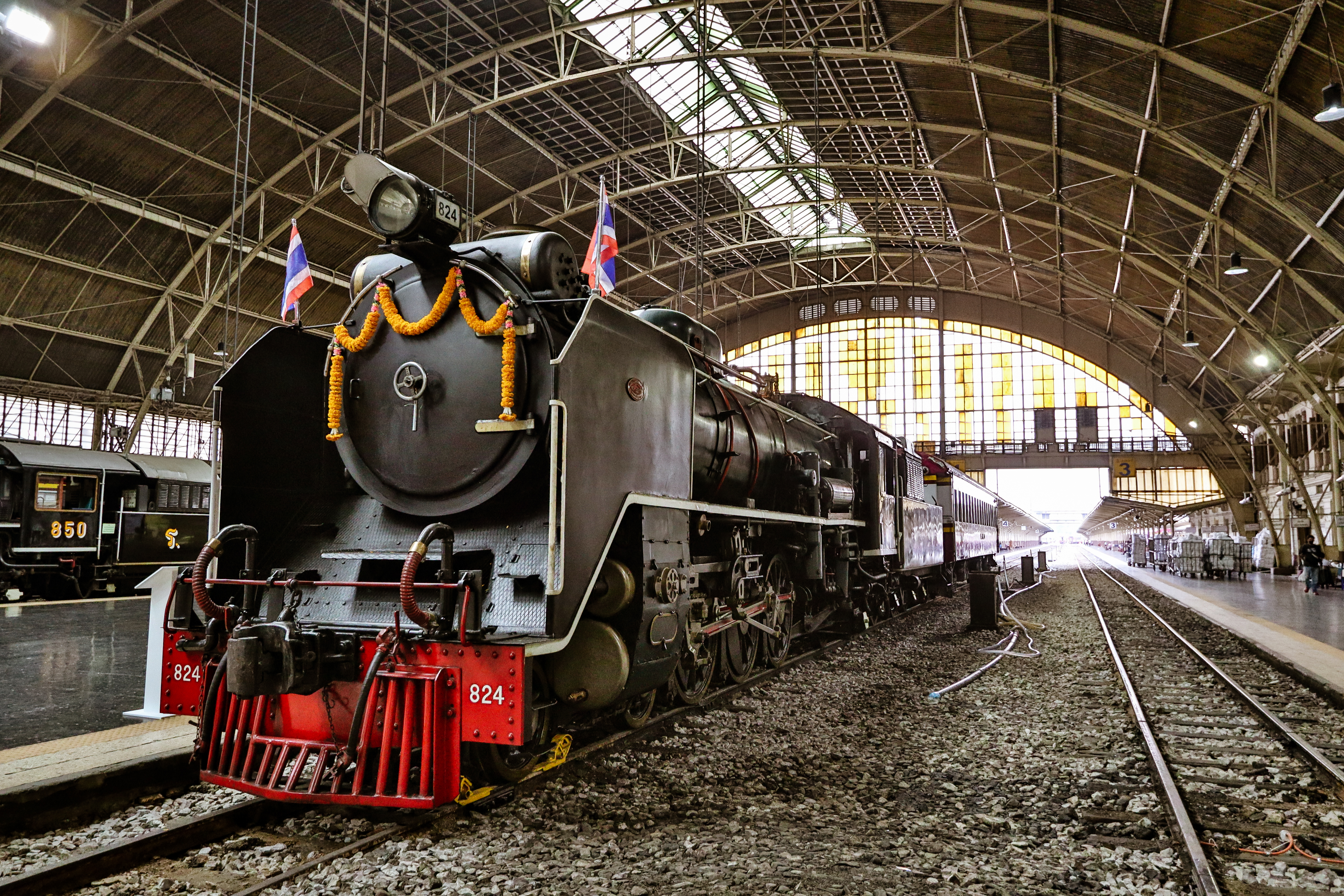
824 and 850 displayed at Hua Lamphong. 850 can be seen in the background to the left of 824.

These locomotives were relatively similar to the earlier Mikados in principle. The Pacifics were standardised to the greatest extent with the Mikados, which were superheated two-cylinder locomotives. The large size of their superheaters resulted in hotter steam, enabling higher thermal efficiency. Their wide steel fireboxes were round-topped and their grates were horizontal. However, the tender bogies were of the plate frame contrsuction on the Pacifics instead of the "Diamond" pattern used on the Mikados, which saved weight and allowed an increased fuel and water capacity by an extra cubic metre.
