= Nippon Sharyo =

Japanese rolling stock manufacturer

Nippon Sharyo, Ltd.

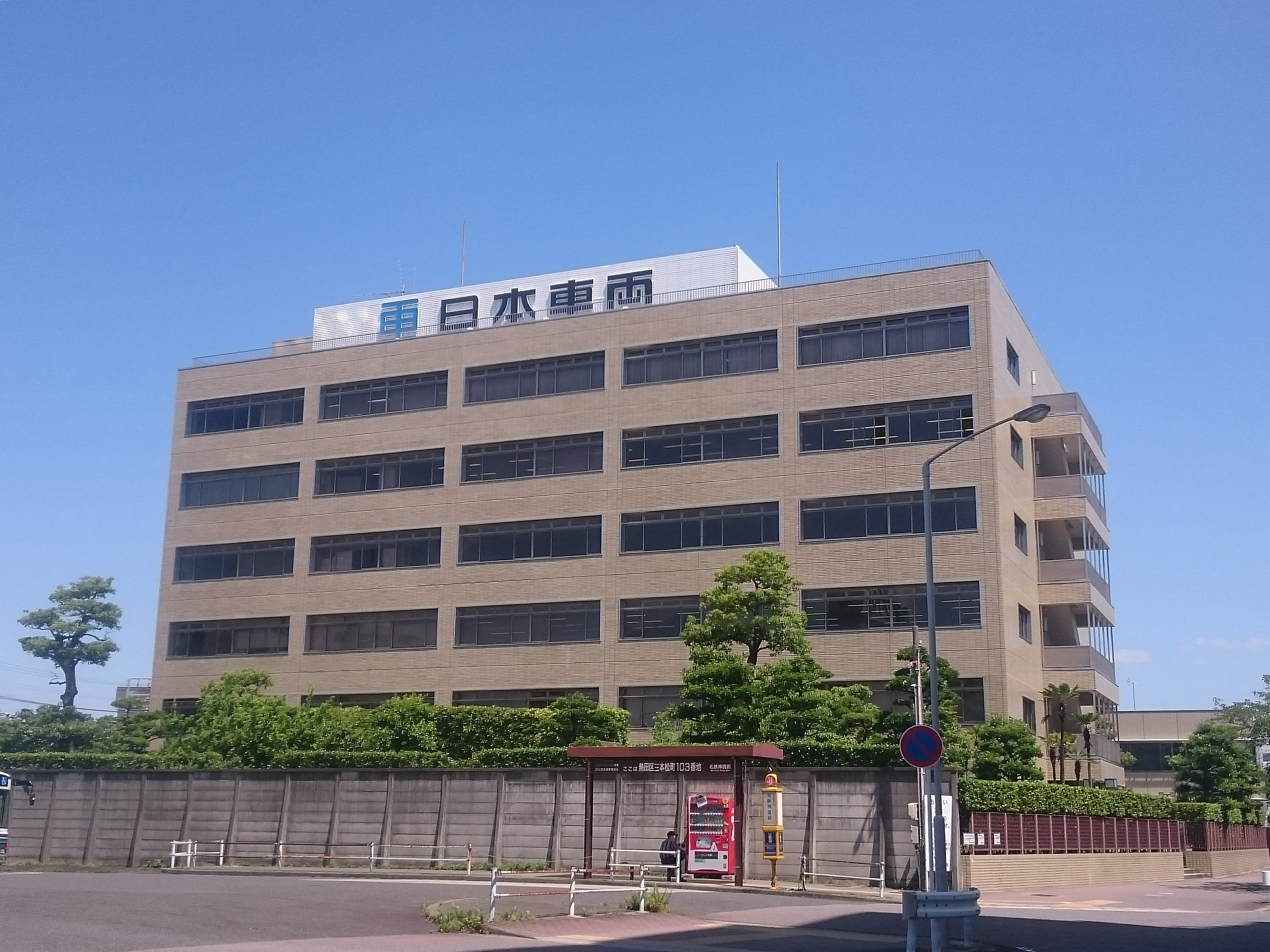
- Nippon Sharyo's headquarters
- Native name: 日本車輌製造株式会社
- Romanized name: Nippon Sharyō Seizō kabushiki gaisha
- Formerly: Nippon Sharyo Seizo Kaisha, Ltd.
- Company type: Public KK
- Traded as: TYO: 7102; NAG: 7102
- Industry: Railways, Heavy Equipment, Diesel Generator
- Founded: September 1896; 129 years ago Japan
- Headquarters: Nagoya, Japan
- Key people: Tsutomu Morimura (President & CEO), Mikio Tsuge (Senior Managing Director of Nippon Sharyo, Ltd and Chairman of Nippon Sharyo USA, Inc.)
- Products: Rolling stock
- Revenue: 101,094,000,000 yen (2017)
- Operating income: −5,104,000,000 yen (2017)
- Net income: −5,114,000,000 yen (2017)
- Total assets: 129,194,000,000 yen (2017)
- Number of employees: 1,850 (September 2018)
- Parent: JR Central (50.1%)
- Website: www.n-sharyo.co.jp/index_e.html

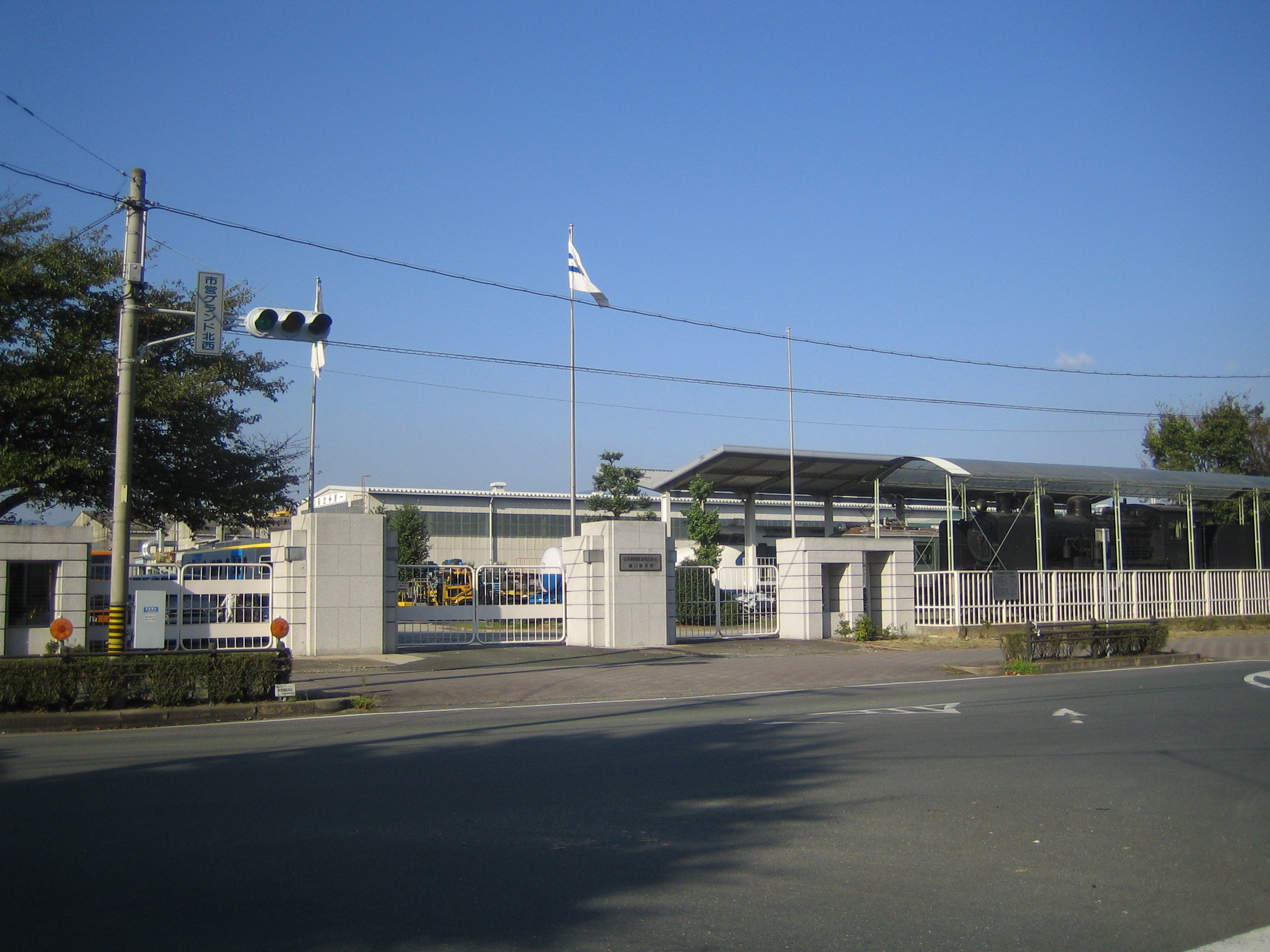
Nippon Sharyo rolling stock factory in Toyokawa, Aichi

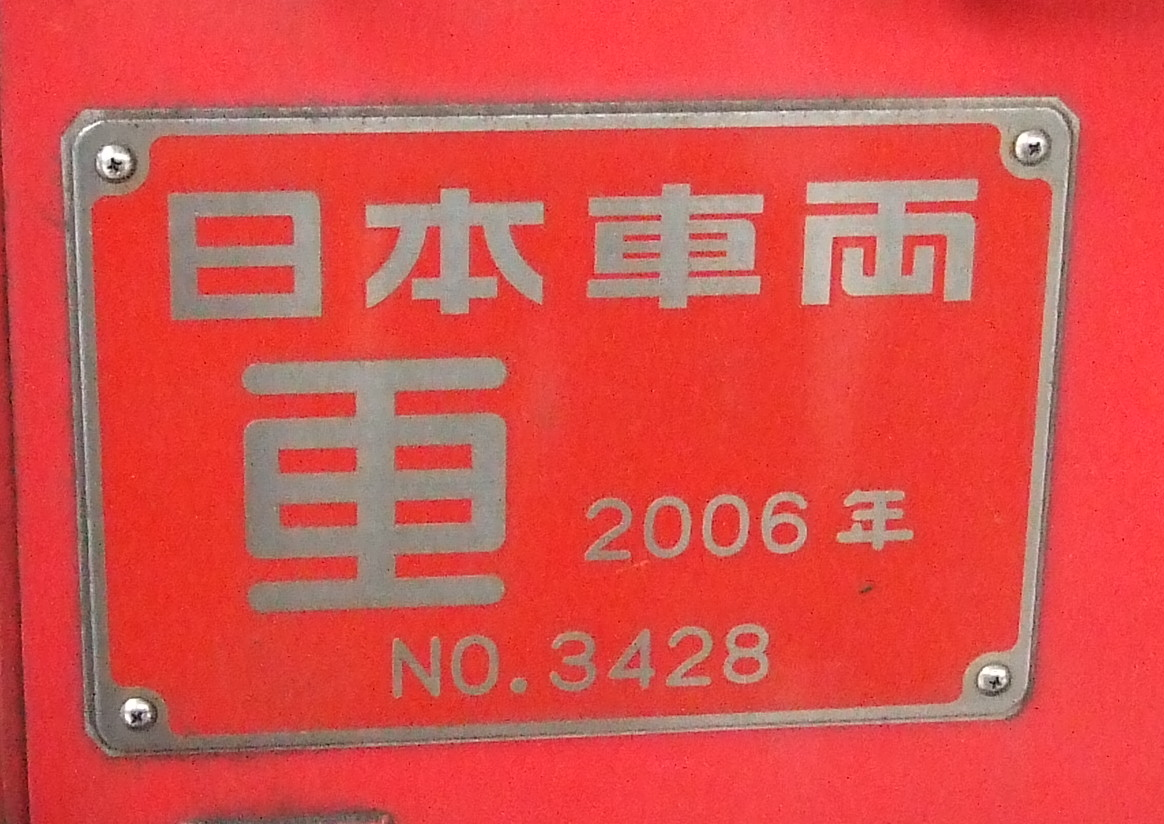
Nippon Sharyo builder's plate

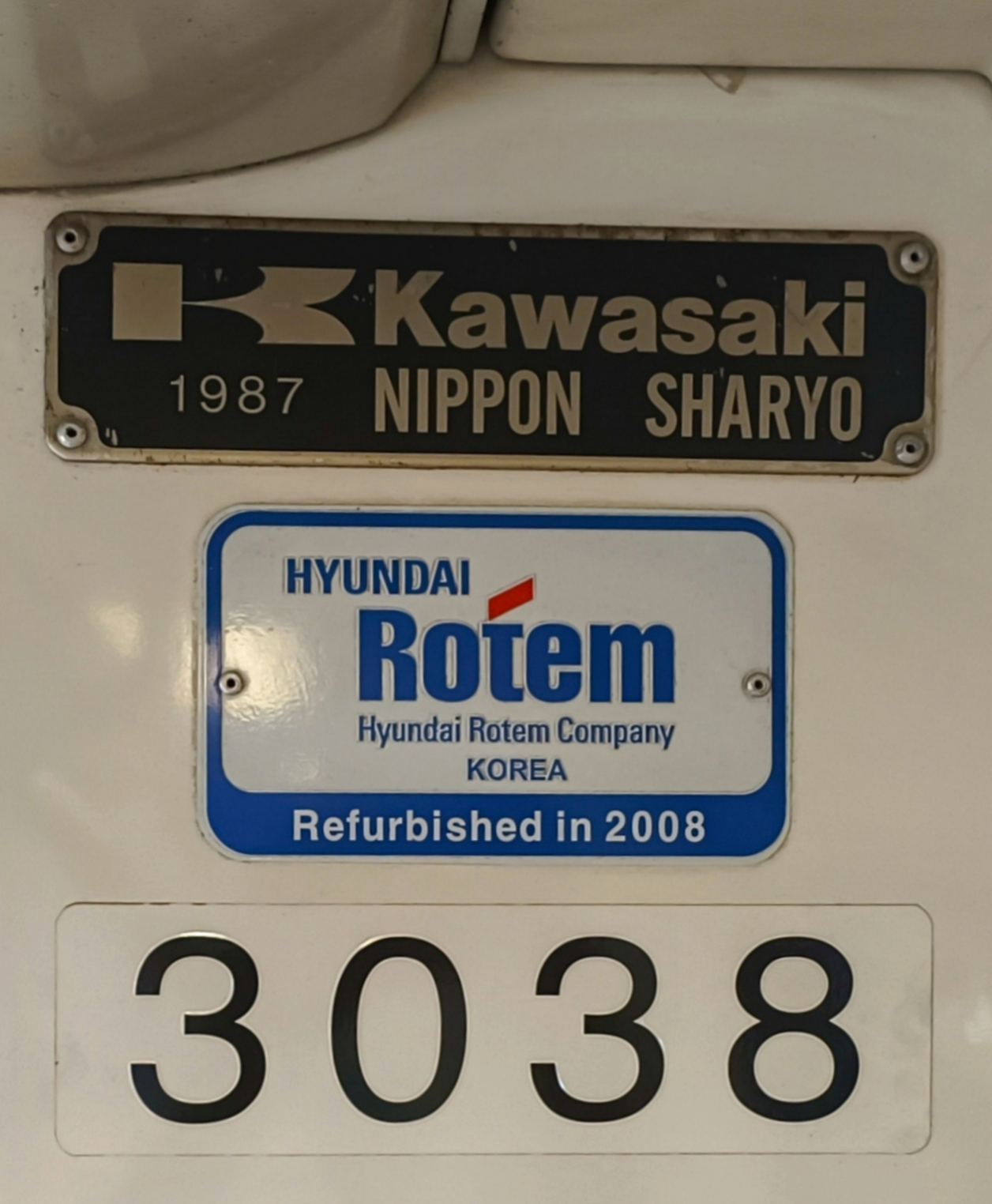
1987 Kawasaki-Nippon Sharyo Seizo Kaisha builder's plate on a C151 Train (Singapore MRT)

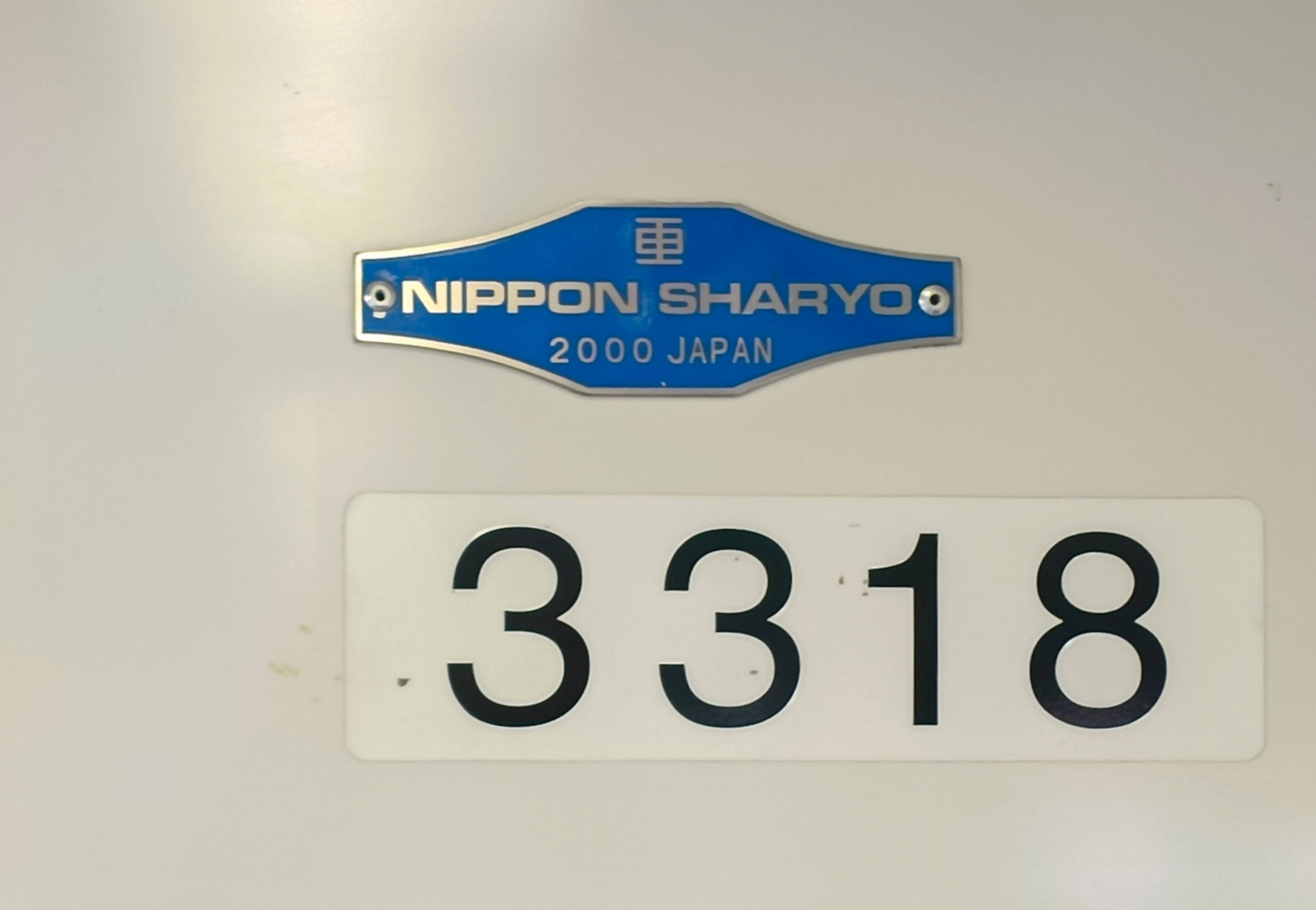
2000 Nippon Sharyo, Ltd builder's plate on a C751B Train (Singapore MRT)

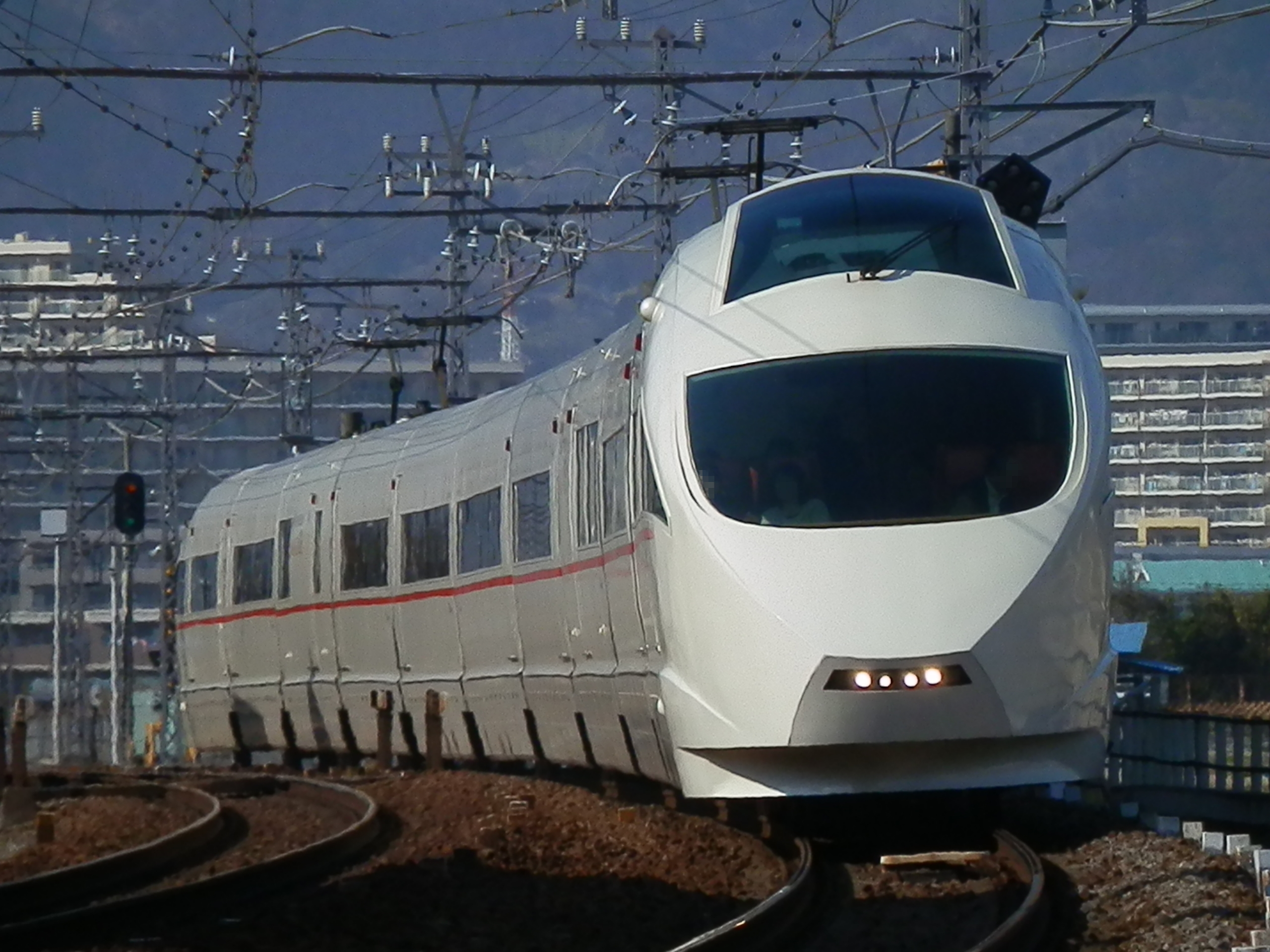
Nippon Sharyo built Odakyu 50000 series VSE EMU

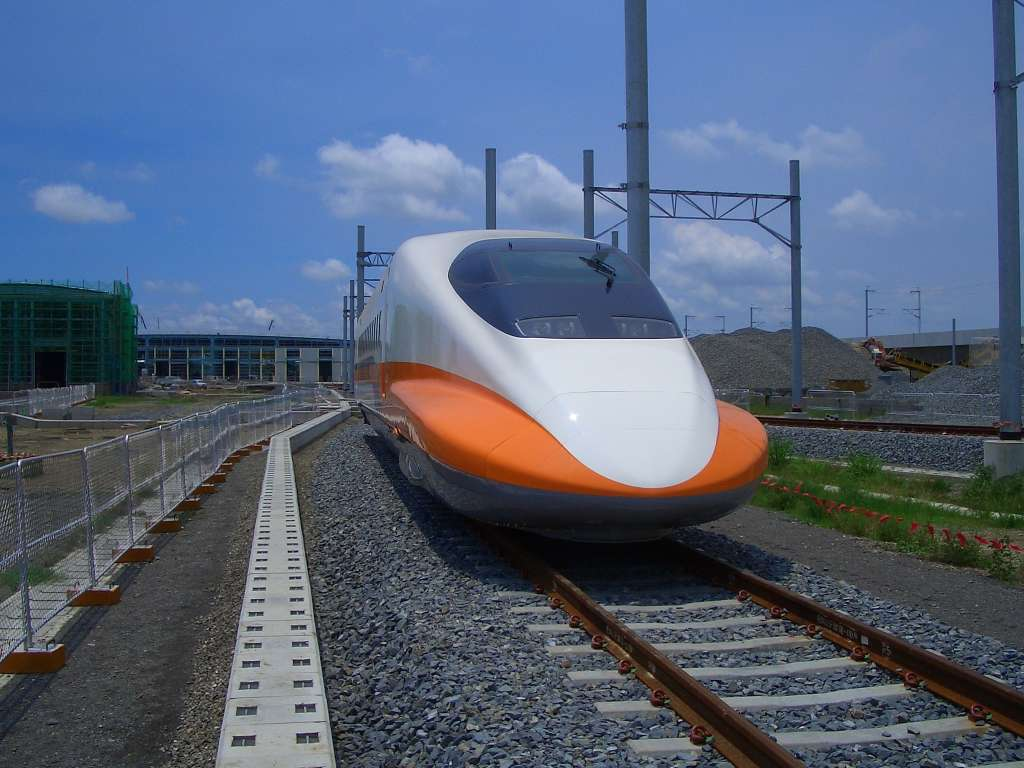
Taiwan High Speed Railway series 700T, made by a consortium including Nippon Sharyo

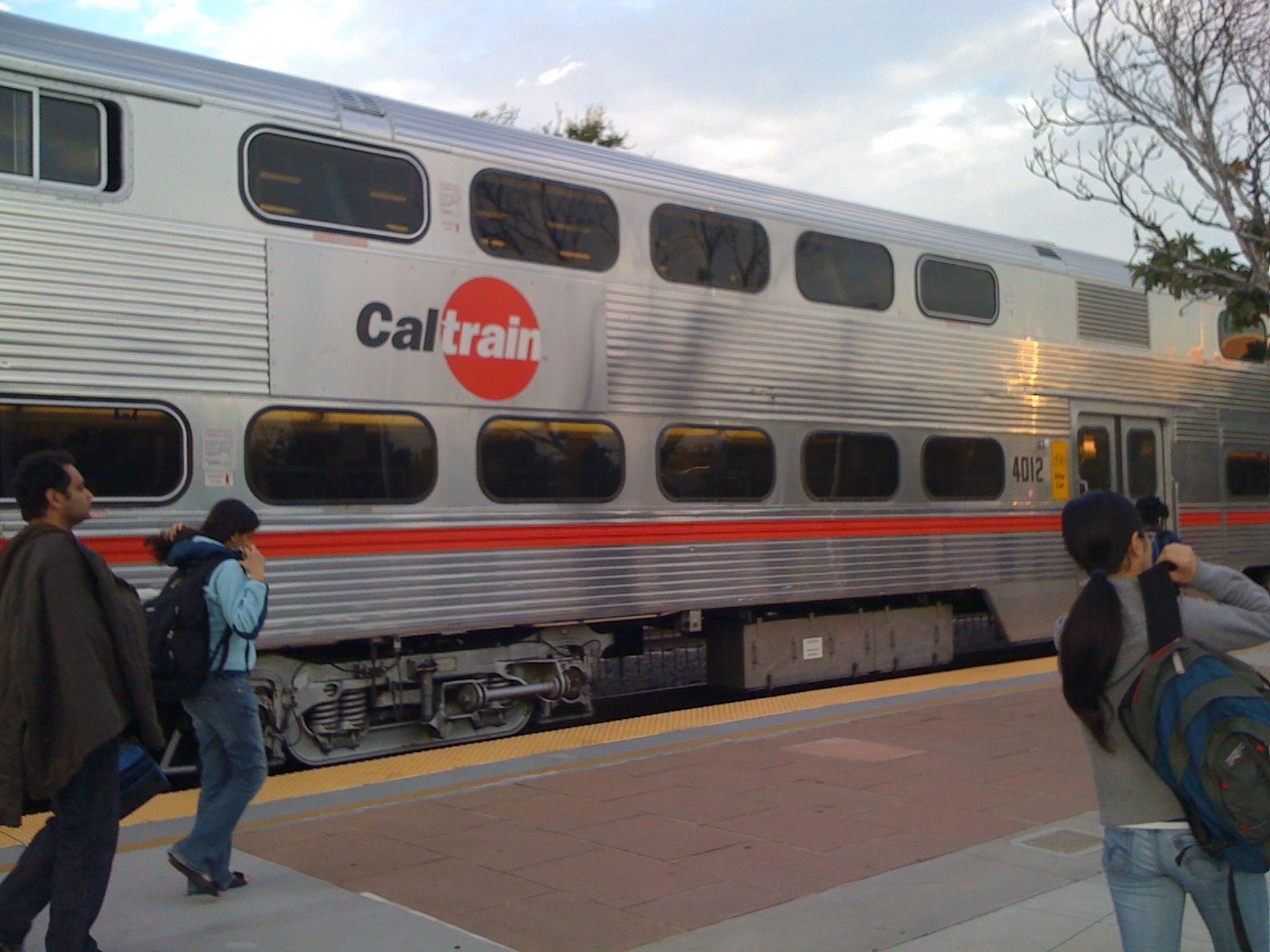
Caltrain gallery car

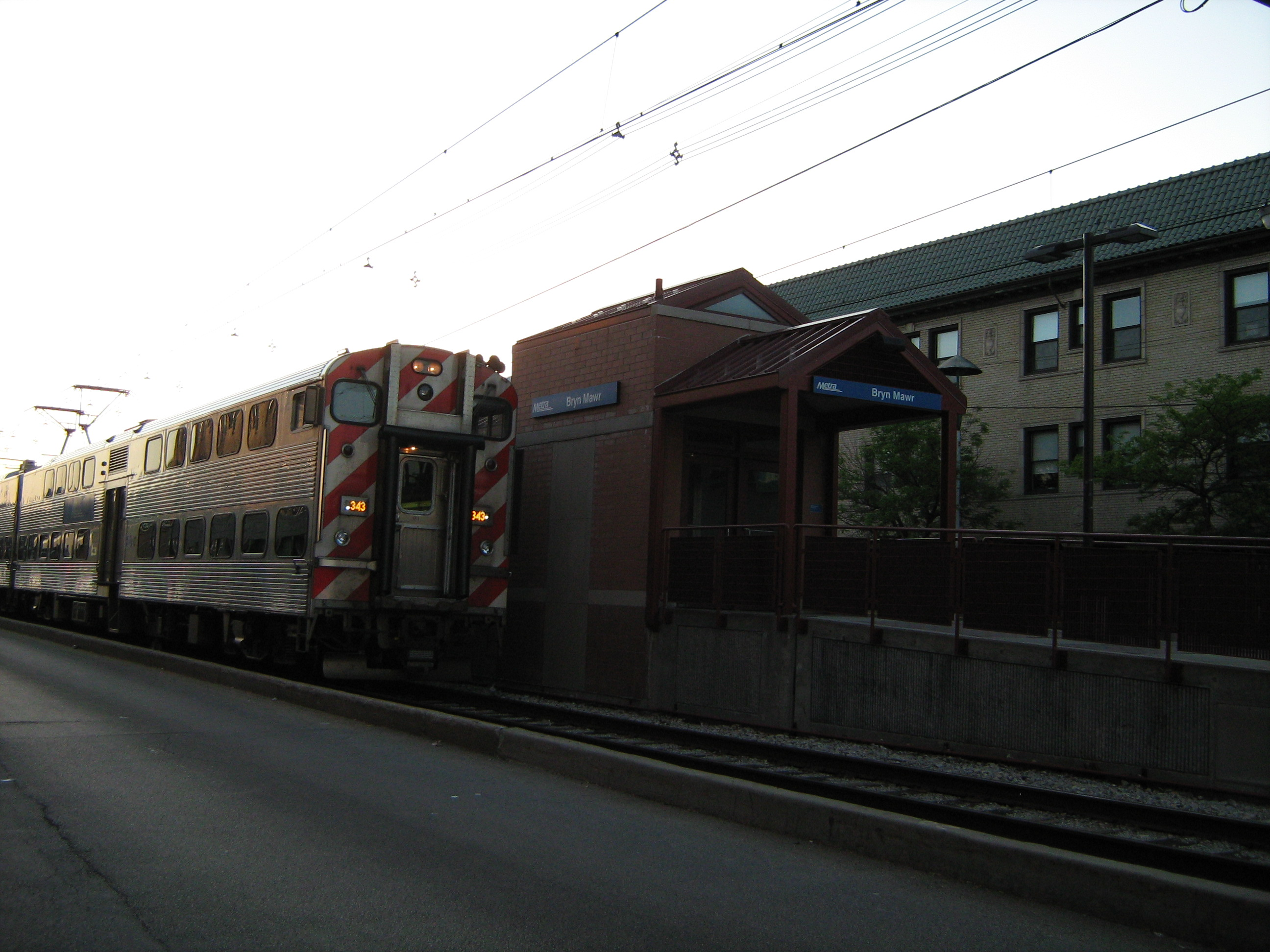
Highliner II car

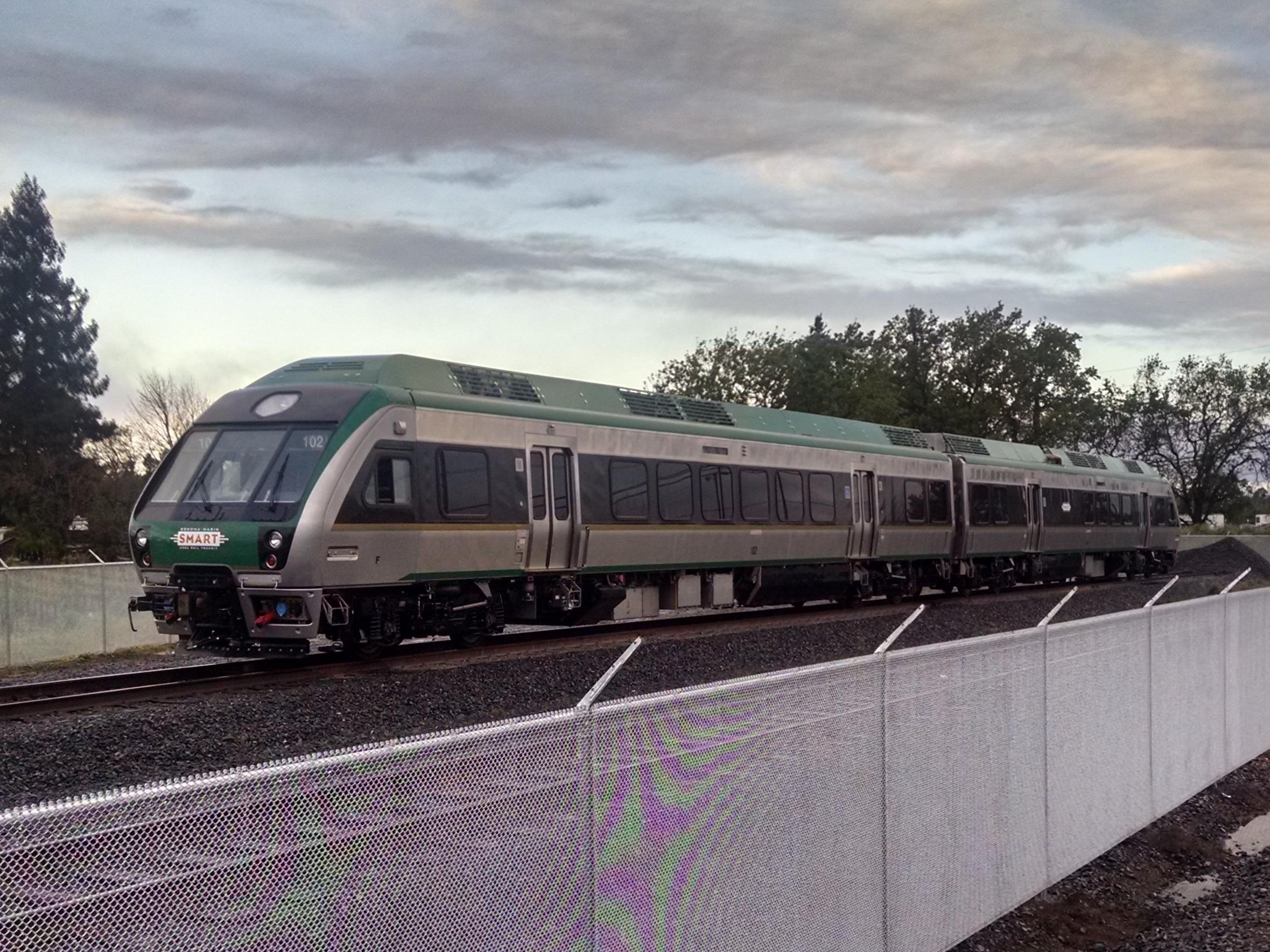
Sonoma-Marin Area Rail Transit (SMART) rolling stock, Nippon Sharyo DMU

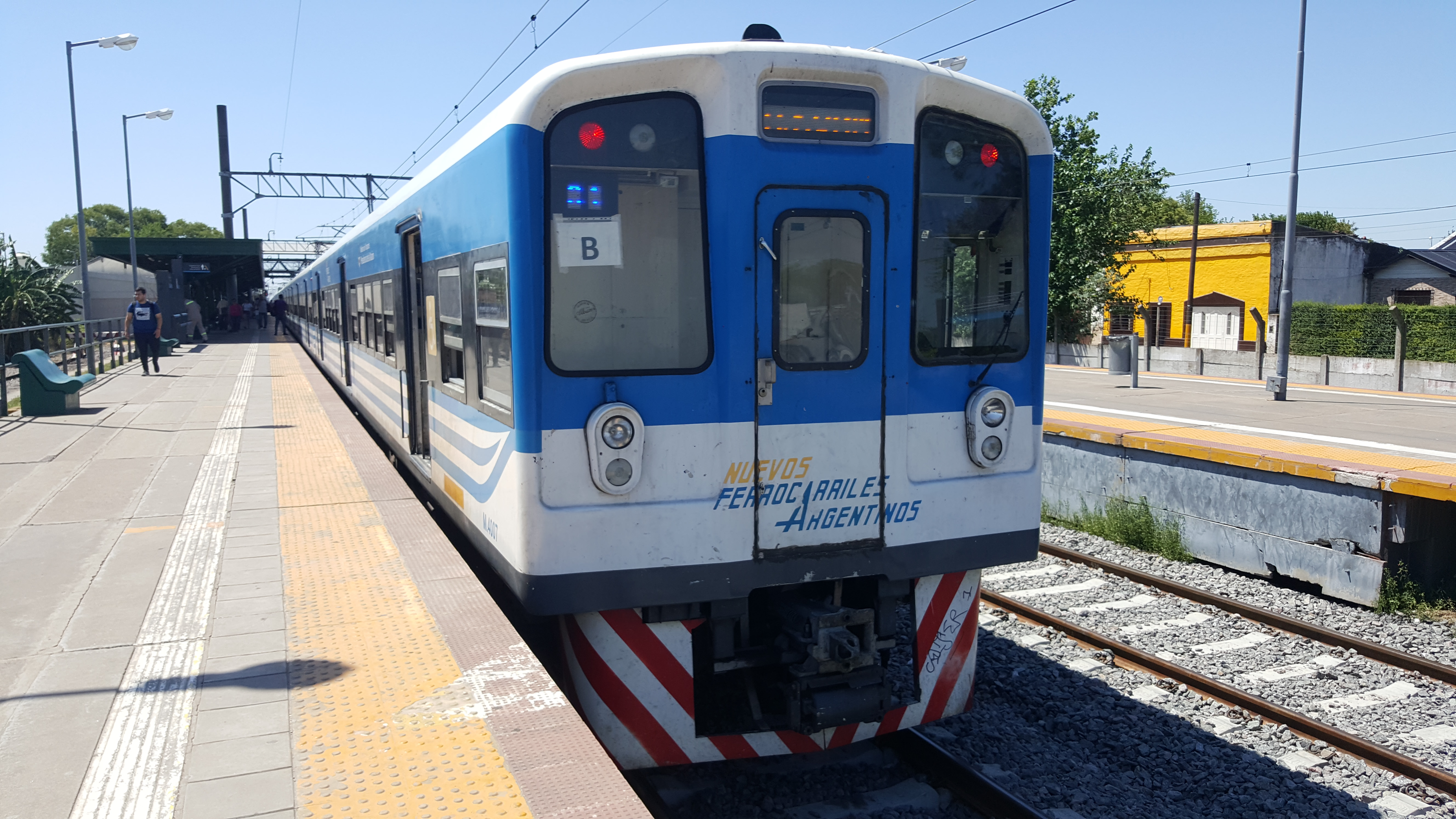
EMU Linea General Roca Argentina

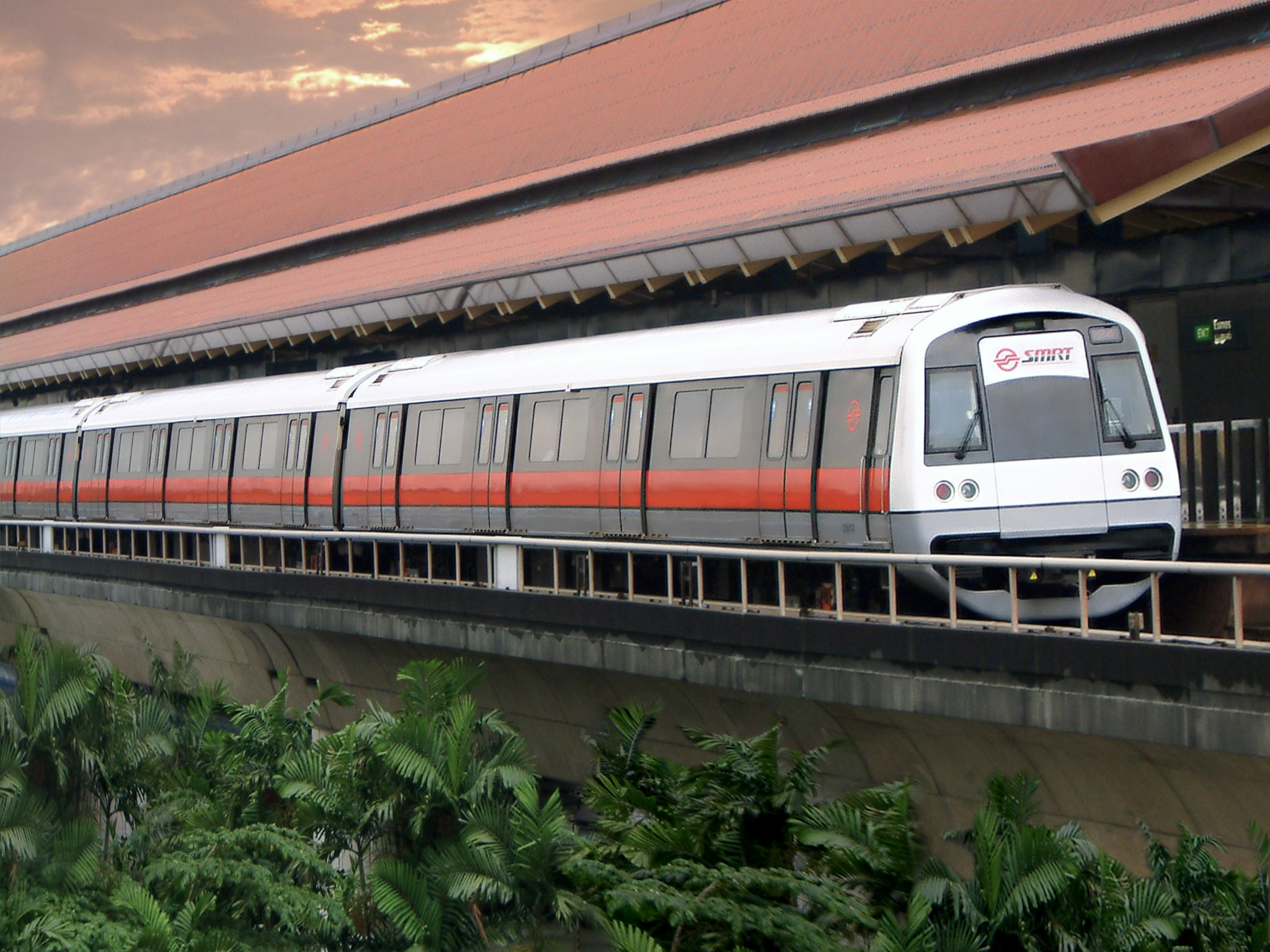
Singapore MRT C751B

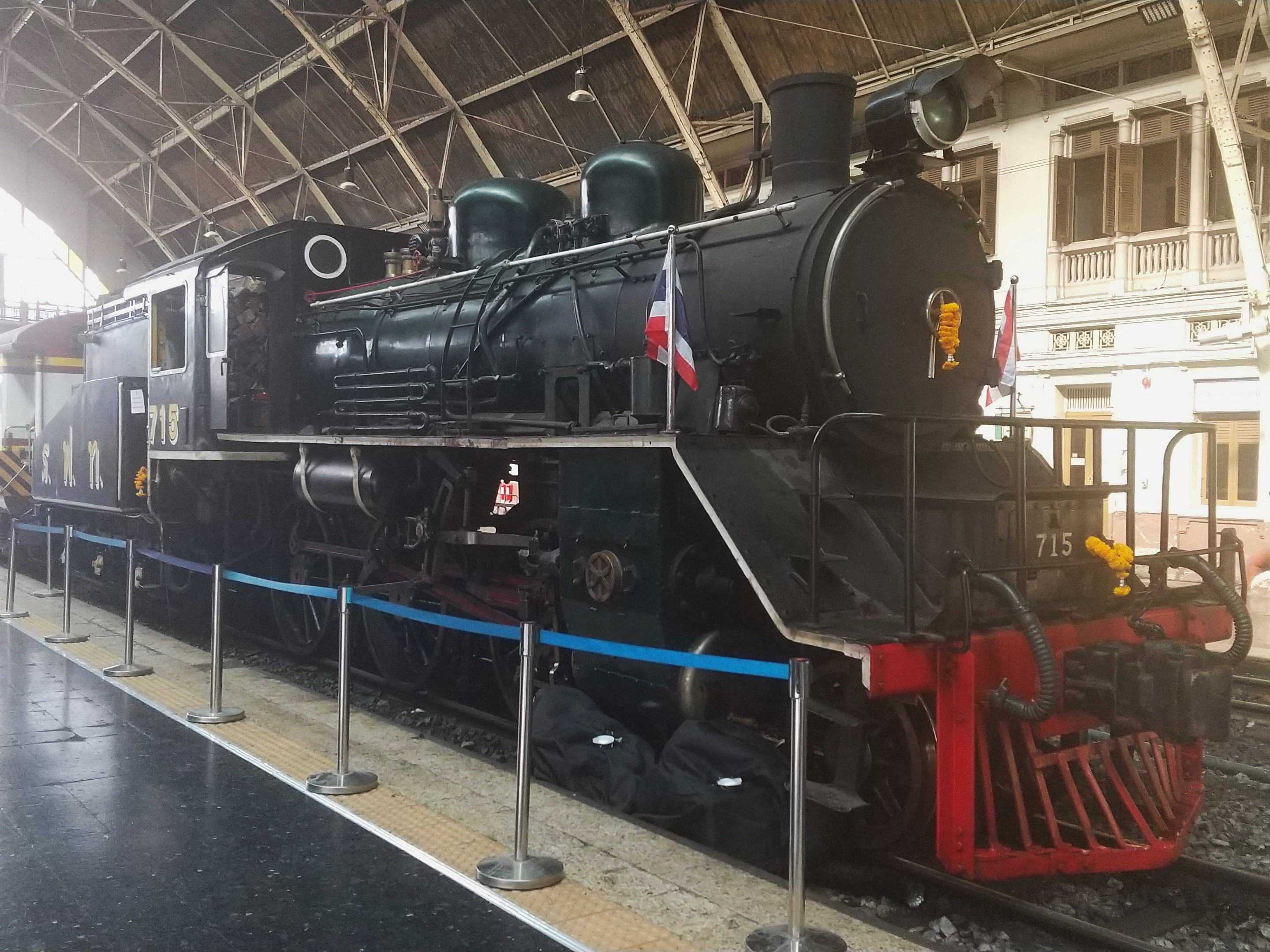
State Railway of Thailand C56 SL

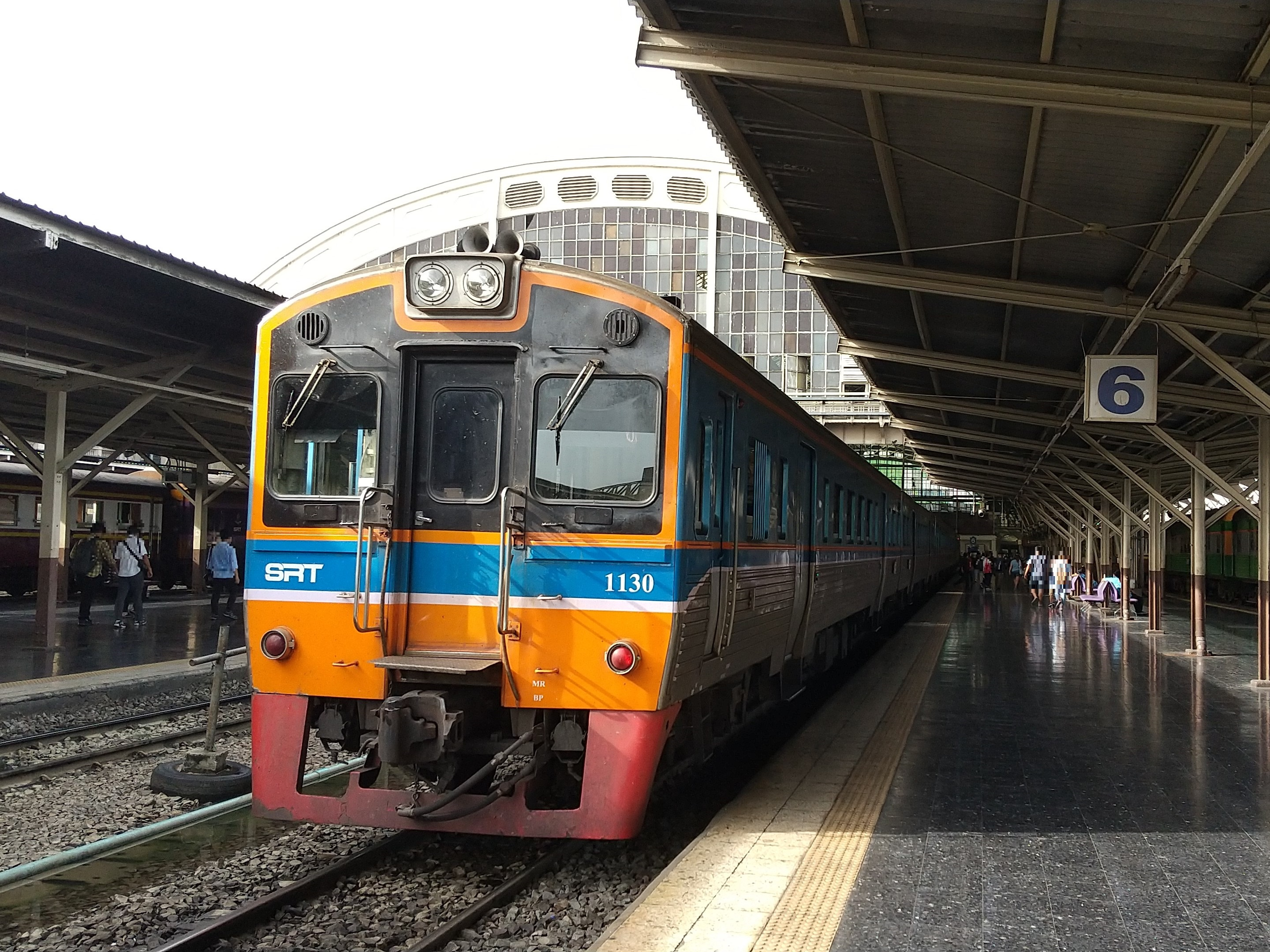
State Railway of Thailand THN DMU

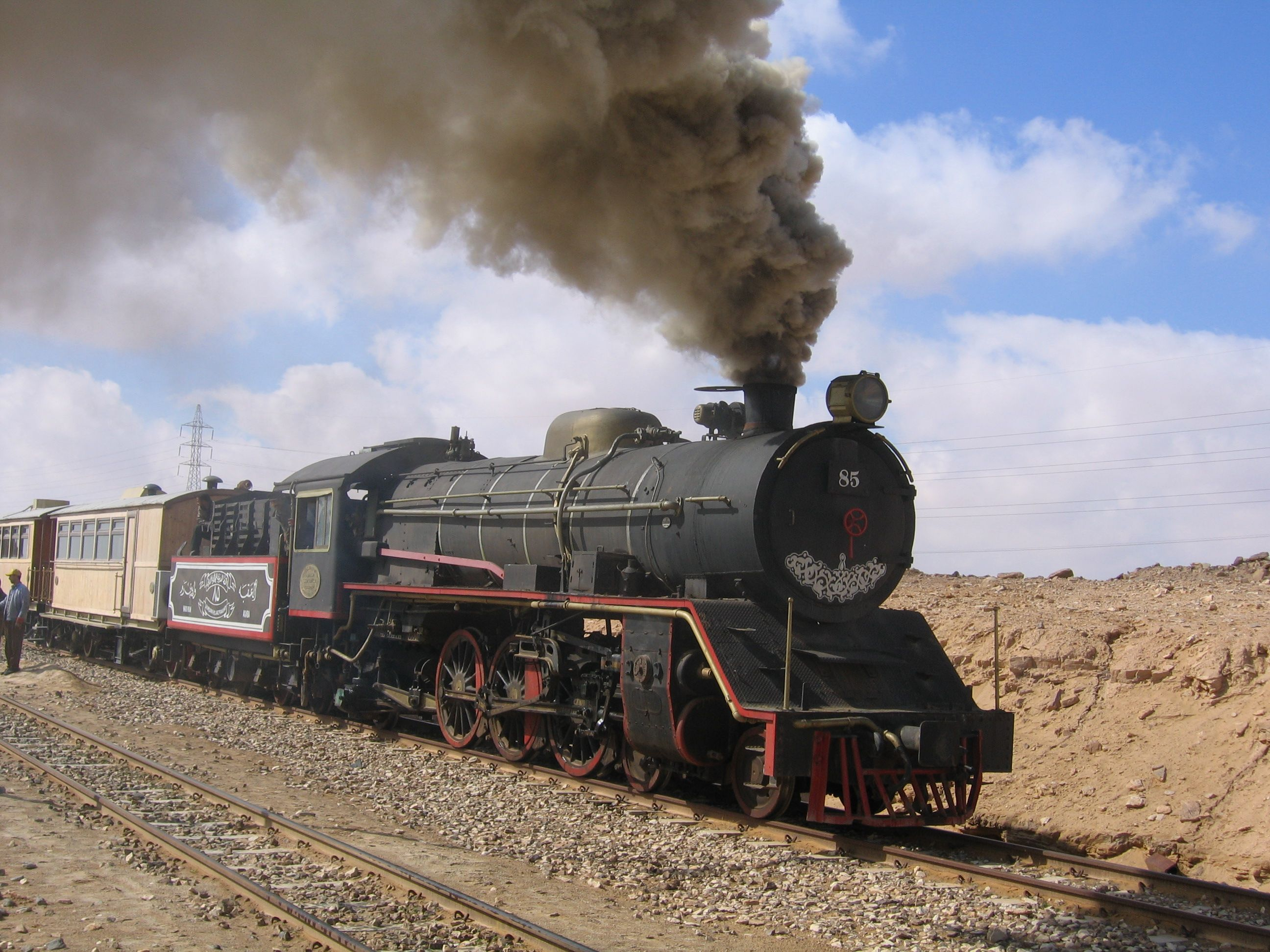
Hejaz railway CX50 SL

Nippon Sharyo, Ltd. (日本車輌製造株式会社, Nippon Sharyō Seizō kabushiki gaisha; literally "Japan Rolling Stock Manufacture Company" and formerly known outside Japan as Nippon Sharyo Seizo Kaisha, Ltd.), formed in 1896, is a major rolling stock, heavy equipment, generator, special purpose vehicle and bridge manufacturer based in Nagoya, Japan. In 1996, it abbreviated its name to "日本車両" Nippon Sharyō. Its shortest abbreviation is Nissha "日車". It was a listed company on Nikkei 225 until 2004. It is listed on the Tokyo Stock Exchange and Nagoya Stock Exchange as ticker 7102. In 2008, Central Japan Railway Company (JR Central) became the majority shareholder (50.1%) of the financially struggling Nippon Sharyo making the firm a "consolidated subsidiary" of JR Central. In July 2012 Nippon Sharyo USA started production in their new facility in Rochelle, Illinois. The facility closed at the end of October 2018 due to a lack of orders.

== Notable projects ==
=== Japan ===
- Shinkansen ("bullet train") trainsets
  - 0 series
  - 100 series
  - 200 series
  - 300 series
  - 500 series
  - 700 series
  - N700 series
  - E2 series
- Odakyu Electric Railway trainsets
  - Odakyu 1000 series
  - Odakyu 2000 series
  - Odakyu 3000 series
  - Odakyu 4000 series
  - Odakyu 30000 series EXE
  - Odakyu 50000 series VSE
  - Odakyu 60000 series MSE
  - Odakyu 70000 series GSE
- Linimo maglev train
- Keisei Electric Railway trainsets
  - Keisei 3000 series
  - Keisei 3050 series
  - Keisei AE100 series
  - Keisei AE series
- Nearly all Meitetsu trains

=== Argentina ===
- Roca Line
  - Toshiba EMU
- Buenos Aires Underground
  - Nagoya 250/300/1200 series (Retired in 2019)
  - Nagoya 5000 series

=== Brazil ===
- SuperVIA Série 500
- Porto Alegre Metro EMUs

=== Canada ===
- Toronto Transit Commission work cars
  - RT10 Garbage car 1967 – Tokyo Rose retired in 2000 and scrapped
  - RT12 Electric locomotive 1968 (design similar to JNR Class DE locomotive), retired 2009 and scrapped
  - RT13 Centre cab crane 1968 – with car and crane cabs
  - RT22 Flat car 1973 – formerly wash car RT-17 and rebuilt 1996
  - RT54 flat car 1973
- Union Pearson Express Diesel Multiple Units
  - Nippon Sharyo DMU (jointly with Sumitomo Corporation) 2014

=== Philippines ===
- Manila Light Rail Transit System Line 1 (jointly with Kinki Sharyo)
  - LRTA 1200 class

=== Singapore ===
- Singapore MRT EMU
  - C751B
  - C151

=== Republic of China ===
- Taiwan Railway Administration
  - DR1000 gasoline railcar
  - EMU700 local/commuter train
  - EMU800 local/commuter train
  - DMU3100 express train
  - TEMU 2000 Tilting trains
- Taiwan High Speed Rail
  - THSR 700T

=== United States ===
- Next Generation Bi-Level Passenger Rail Car
- Los Angeles County Metro Rail P865 and P2020
- Northern Indiana South Shore Line EMUs
- Maryland MARC Train single-level push-pull coaches (jointly with Sumitomo Corporation)
- Bi-level gallery cars for Chicago Metra, Virginia VRE, and San Francisco Bay Area Caltrain
- Highliner bi-level EMUs for Metra and South Shore Line
- Sonoma–Marin Area Rail Transit Nippon Sharyo DMU (jointly with Sumitomo Corporation)

=== Venezuela ===
I.F.E EMUs Working on Caracas-Cua commuter line Railway System Ezequiel Zamora (Central)

=== Indonesia ===
Rheostatic series (KRL Rheostatik Mild Steel and Stainless) (The train was also made by Kawasaki Heavy Industries and Hitachi):

- Built 1976: Has 2 doors and uses mild steel body types
- Built 1978,1983,1984: Has 3 doors and uses mild steel body types
- Built 1986,1987: Has 3 doors and uses stainless steel body types

All Rheostatic EMUs have stopped operating in the Jabodetabek lines and is currently waiting to be scrapped.

Shinko Diesel Multiple Units (a.k.a. KRD MCW 301 and KRD MCW 302) are used for short-distance lines such as Surabaya-Lamongan, Surabaya-Sidoarjo, etc.

- KRD MCW 301 Built 1976: Has 2 doors and uses mild steel body types
- KRD MCW 302 Built 1978,1980,1982,1987: Has 3 doors and uses mild steel body types

KRD MCW 301 and 302 initially uses the Shinko DMH17H engine and Niigata TCR 2.5 transmission

Note: The DMUs built in 1976 are now used as regular loco-hauled trains without engines. The DMUs made in 1978, 1980, & 1982 upwards are refurbished with a Cummins Engine (NT885-R) and Voith turbo (T211re.3) transmission.

The new rolling stock, known as the MRTJ 1000, was built specifically for the Jakarta MRT

=== Thailand ===
- State Railway of Thailand
  - SL
    - C56 (Numbers 715-716 and 723-729 or formerly owned by Japanese Government Railways, numbers 17-18 ,28 ,30-32 ,34 and 36-37 In 1979, Japan asked to buy back the steam locomotive C56, number 725, original C56 31, back to its homeland of Japan. It is on display at the Yūshūkan Museum. But there are traces of having been used in Thailand. The driver's cab has the number 725 and the transport vehicle has Thai letters (ร.ฟ.ท.) SRT.)
    - RSR Japanese Mikado locomotives (Numbers 351-352 and 363-364)
    - RSR Japanese Pacific locomotives (nos. 288-292, 821-834, 837-841, and 850)
  - DMU
    - RHN (jointly with Hitachi)
    - THN (Numbers 1128-1140)
    - NKF (Numbers 1201-1212 and 1217-1224)

=== Jordan ===
Five Pacific locomotives were built by Nippon Sharyo for the State Railway of Thailand in 1953 to the same design of Pacific locomotives introduced in 1942 and 1949 for the railway, but were never delivered. Later, they would be allocated to the Jordan Hejaz Railway (JHR) after a conversion to 1050mm gauge and renumbering to nos. 81-5.

== Other Products ==
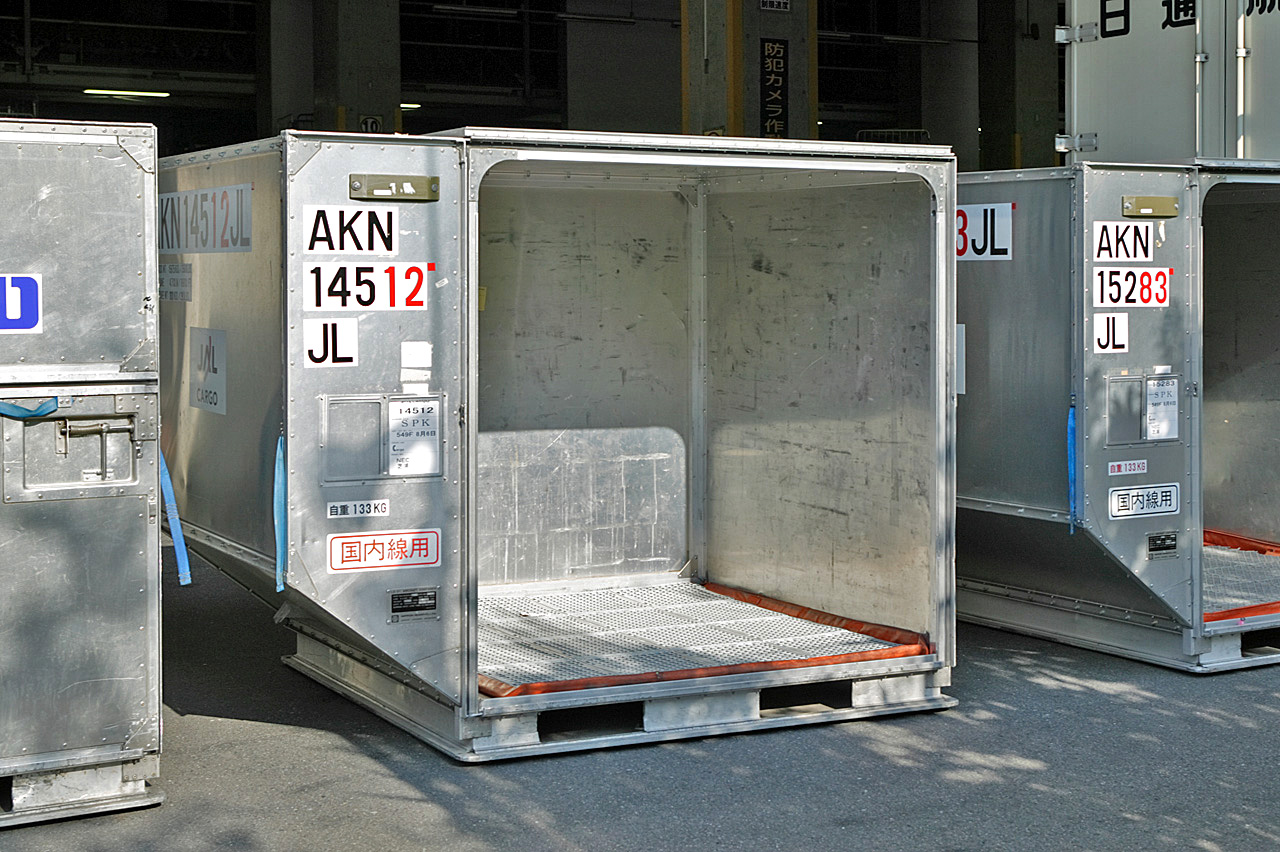
Nippon Sharyo LD3 Unit Load Device

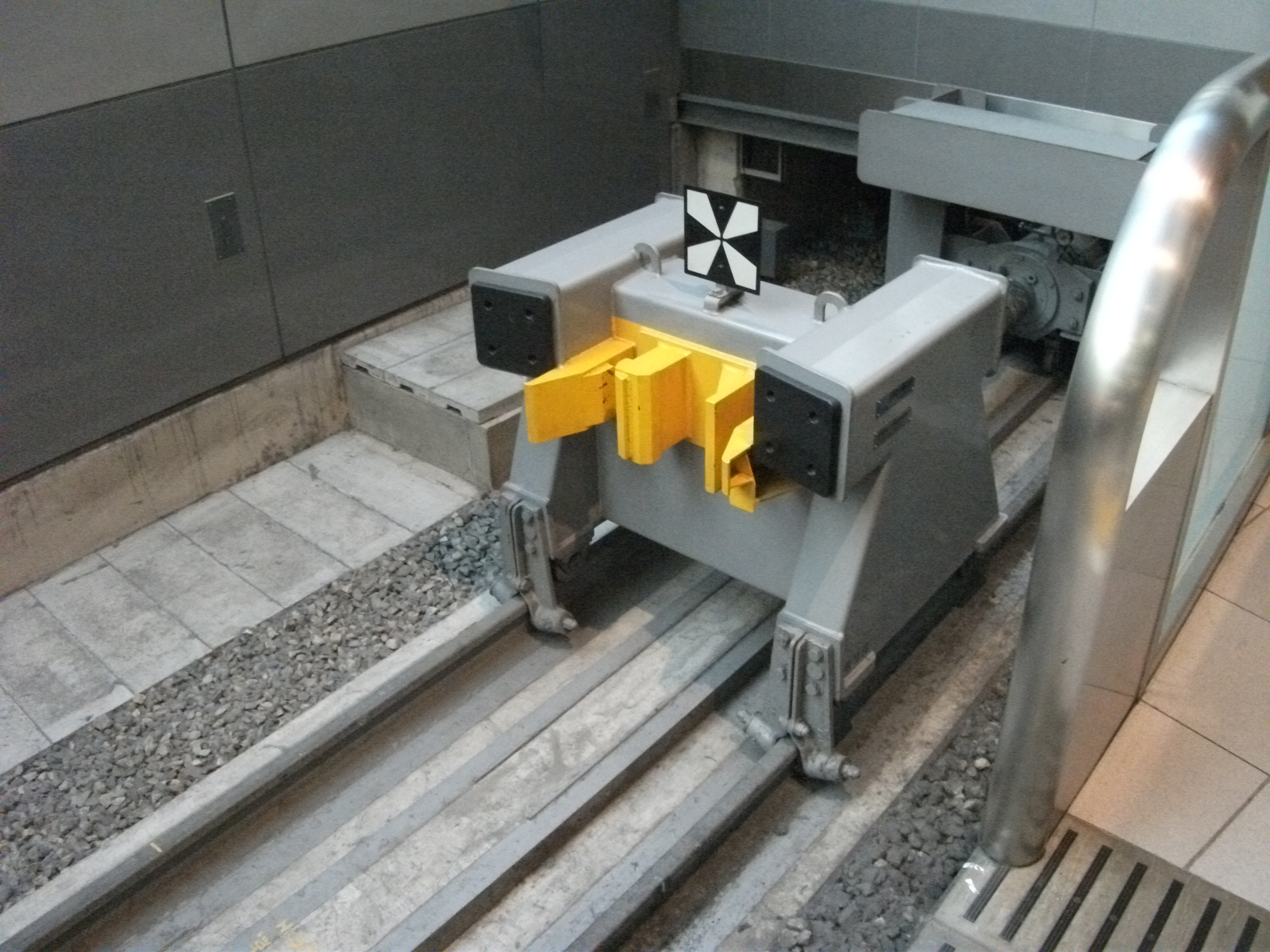
Buffer Stop manufactured by Nippon Sharyo together with Kayaba Industries

- Unit load device
  - Buffer stop
  - Earth Drill Machine

=== Diesel Generators ===
- Diesel generator
- Portable Generators
- Electric Welding Machine

=== Transport Equipment ===
- Tank container
- Tank truck
- Trailer Trucks
- LNG/LPG Storage Tanks

=== Bridges ===
- Keisei Oshiage Line Arakawa Bridge
- Bridges for Chubu Centrair International Airport
- Akashi Kaikyo Bridge
- Rainbow Bridge
- Nagoya Port Triton

== Wartime involvement ==
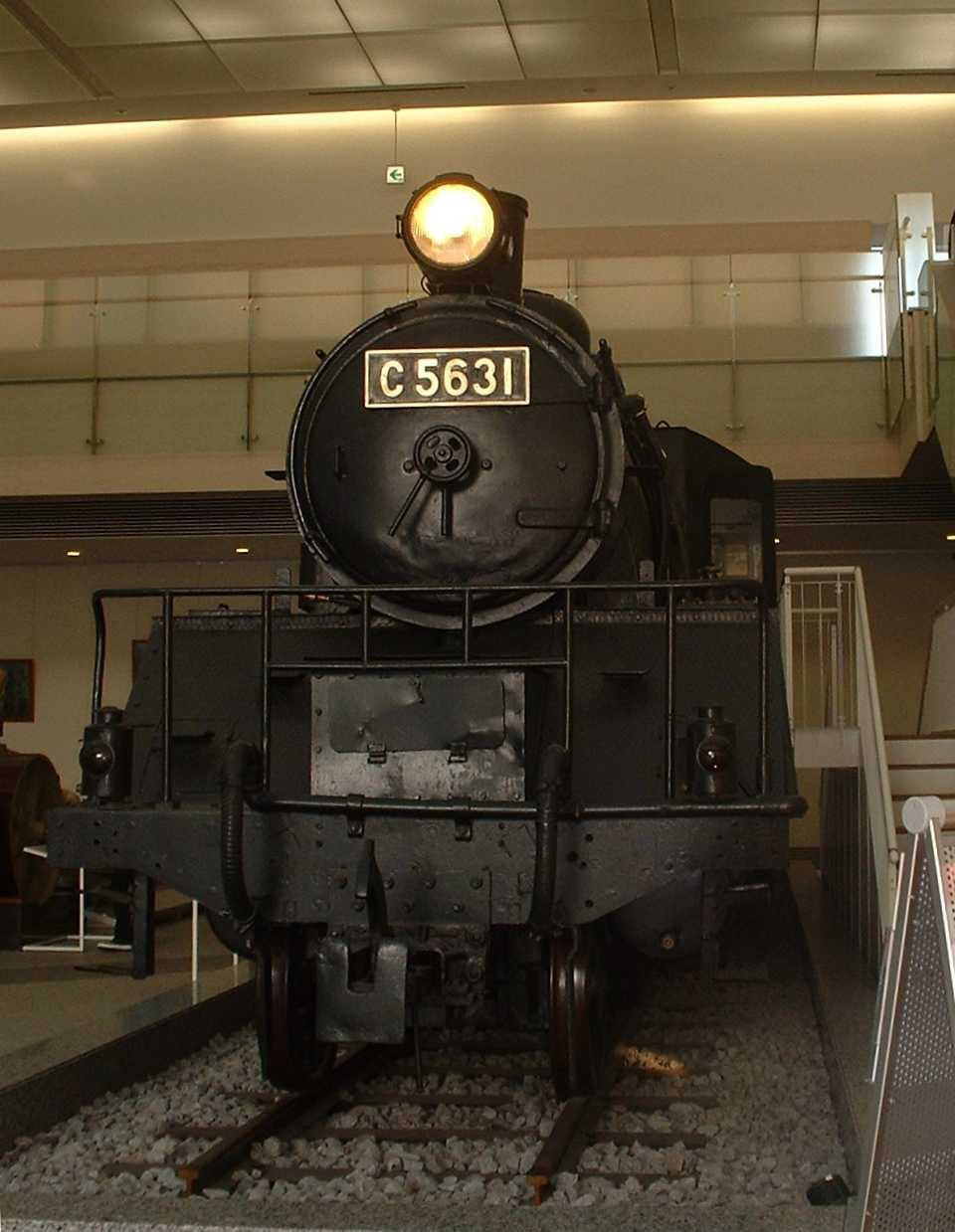
Nippon Sharyo-built C56 31 preserved at Yasukuni War Museum in Tokyo

Nippon Sharyo, in 1936, built the JNR Class C56 steam locomotive number C56 31, which was used in 1943 to open the infamous Thai-Burma Railway, as stylized in the movie The Bridge Over the River Kwai, built by over 100,000 Allied POW and other slave labourers. This restored steam engine now sits in the foyer of the Yasukuni War Museum in Tokyo. Japanese veteran groups raised funds to return the locomotive from Thailand to Japan in 1979.

During World War II, Nippon Sharyo, like many major Japanese companies, drew upon prisoner of war labour to maintain war production. The POW camp at Narumi provided Allied POW forced labour for Nippon Sharyo.
