= 9020 series =

9020 series may refer to:

- Kintetsu 9020 series electric multiple unit train
- Tokyu 9020 series electric multiple unit train, converted from Tokyu 2000 series electric multiple unit trains in 2019
