= Tokyu 2020 series =

Japanese electric multiple unit train type

Tokyu 2020/6020/3020 series
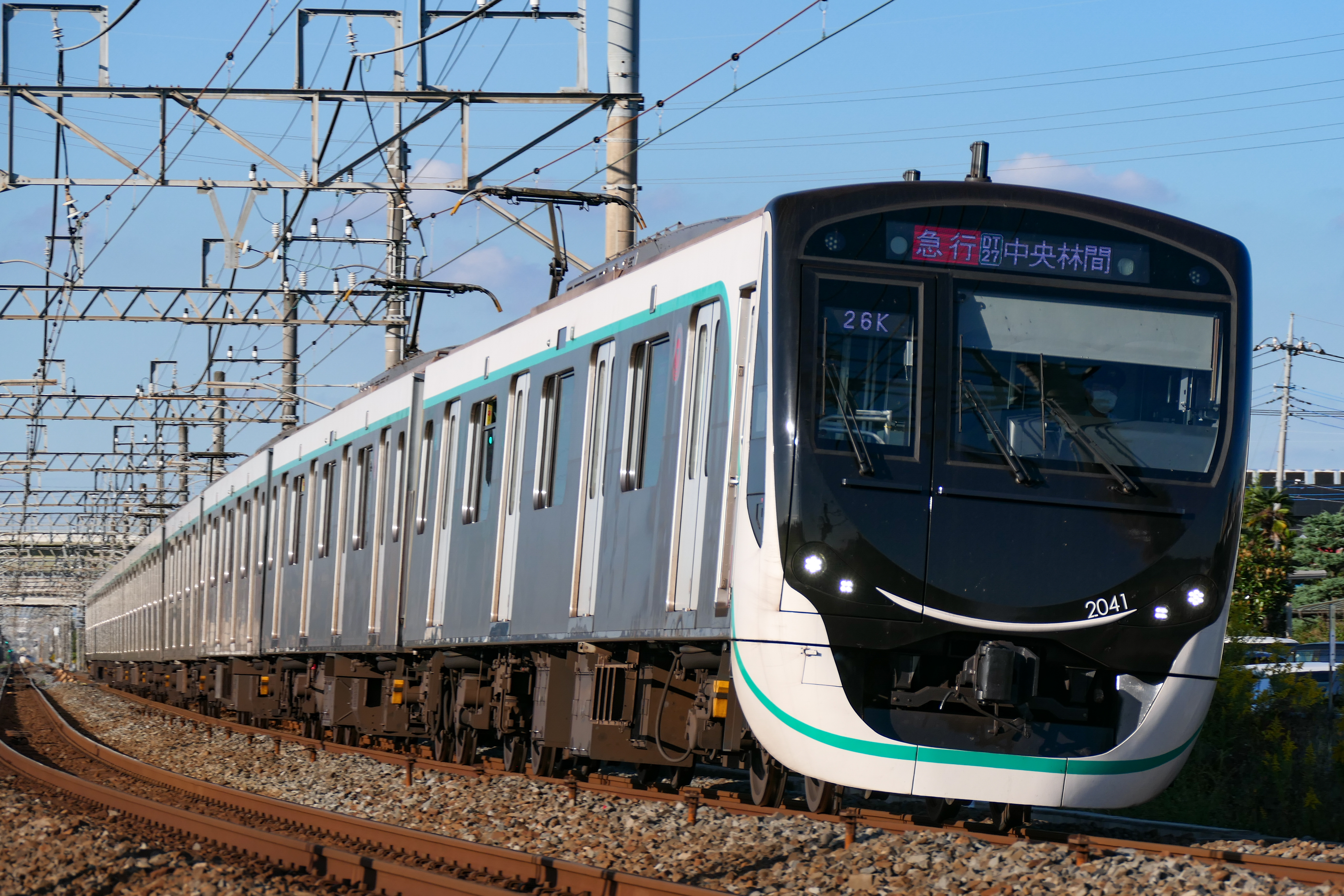
- A Den-en-toshi Line 2020 series set in October 2021
- Manufacturer: J-TREC
- Designer: Tanseisha
- Built at: Niitsu (2020 series only); Yokohama (all)
- Family name: Sustina S24 series
- Operator: Tōkyū Railways

Specifications
- Car body construction: Stainless steel
- Car length: 20,470 mm (67 ft 2 in) (end cars); 20,000 mm (65 ft 7 in) (int. cars)
- Width: 2,788 mm (9 ft 2 in)
- Height: 4,046 mm (13 ft 3 in) (not including pantograph)
- Floor height: 1,130 mm (3 ft 8 in)
- Doors: 4 pairs per side
- Maximum speed: 120 km/h (75 mph) (design)
- Traction system: Variable frequency (SiC-MOSFET)
- Acceleration: 3.3 km/(h⋅s) (2.1 mph/s)
- Deceleration: 4.0 km/(h⋅s) (2.5 mph/s) (service); 4.5 km/(h⋅s) (2.8 mph/s) (emergency)
- Electric systems: 1,500 V DC (overhead catenary)
- Current collection: Pantograph
- Bogies: TS-1041 (motored); TS-1042 (trailer)
- Track gauge: 1,067 mm (3 ft 6 in)

Notes/references
- Details in this infobox apply to the 2020 series and its derivatives. Type-specific details can be found in their respective sections.

The Tokyu 2020 series (東急2020系, Tōkyū 2020-kei) is an electric multiple unit (EMU) commuter train type built by J-TREC and used by the Japanese private railway operator Tokyu Corporation in the Tokyo area since March 2018. The 2020 series is used primarily on the Tokyu Den-en-toshi Line while its derivatives, the 3020 series (3020系, 3020-kei) and the 6020 series (6020系, 6020-kei), are used mainly on the Tokyu Meguro Line and Tokyu Oimachi Line respectively.

== Design ==
The 2020 series trains were built by Japan Transport Engineering Company (J-TREC) as part of its "Sustina S24 Series" family of 20-metre-long four-door stainless steel cars. The styling of the trains was overseen by Tanseisha, a company involved in designing commercial buildings along the Tokyu route.

The classification "2020 series" for the trains was chosen to mark the year 2020 in which the Tokyo Olympics were scheduled to be held and in which Tokyu celebrated its 100th anniversary.

== Variants ==
- 2020 series: 10-car sets used on the Tokyu Den-en-toshi Line since March 2018
- 3020 series: 8-car (originally 6-car) sets used on the Tokyu Meguro Line since November 2019
- 6020 series: 5- and 7-car sets used on the Tokyu Oimachi Line since March 2018

== 2020 series ==
Tokyu 2020 series
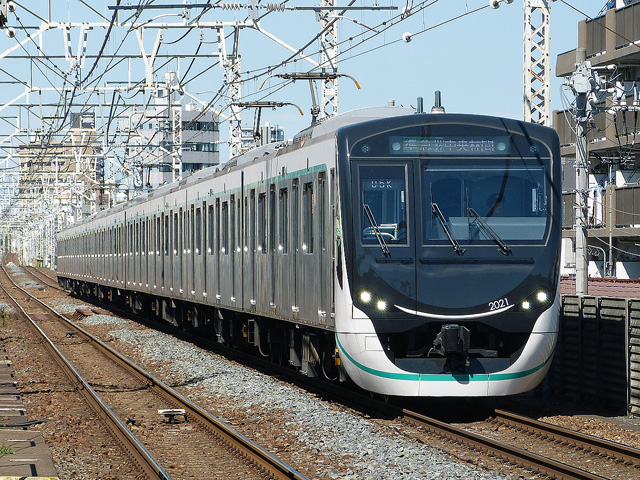
- The first set, 2121, in October 2018
- In service: March 2018 – present
- Built at: Niitsu; Yokohama
- Replaced: 2000 series (displaced to Oimachi Line); 8500 series; 8590 series
- Constructed: 2017–2022
- Entered service: 28 March 2018
- Number under construction: 23 vehicles
- Number built: 300 vehicles (30 sets)
- Number in service: 300 vehicles (30 sets)
- Formation: 10 cars per trainset
- Fleet numbers: 2121–2150
- Depot: Nagatsuta
- Lines served: Tokyu Den-en-toshi Line; Tokyo Metro Hanzomon Line; Tobu Skytree Line; Tobu Isesaki Line; Tobu Nikko Line

Details of the 2020 series were officially announced on 17 March 2017. Three ten-car sets (30 vehicles) are scheduled to be delivered during fiscal 2017, entering service in spring 2018, with further sets introduced over the following years. The first trainset, 2121, was delivered from the J-TREC factory in Yokohama in late November 2017, and shown off to the media on 30 November 2017. The second trainset, 2122, was delivered from the J-TREC factory in Niitsu, Niigata, in February 2018.

The first sets entered service on 28 March 2018.

Due to an October 2025 accident on the Den-en-toshi Line that involved 2020 series set 2135 and resulting service reductions on the line, Tokyu announced in May 2026 that it would order two new 10-car sets, plus three cars to be incorporated into the damaged 2020 series set. The order is planned to be completed by the end of fiscal year 2027.

=== Interior ===
Passenger accommodation consists of high-back longitudinal seats. In addition to passenger information screens placed above the doorways and car ends, LCD screens are also located above the seats. Security cameras are installed in the cars.

To reduce dwell times, sets 2130 onward have six fewer seats in cars 4, 5, and 8.

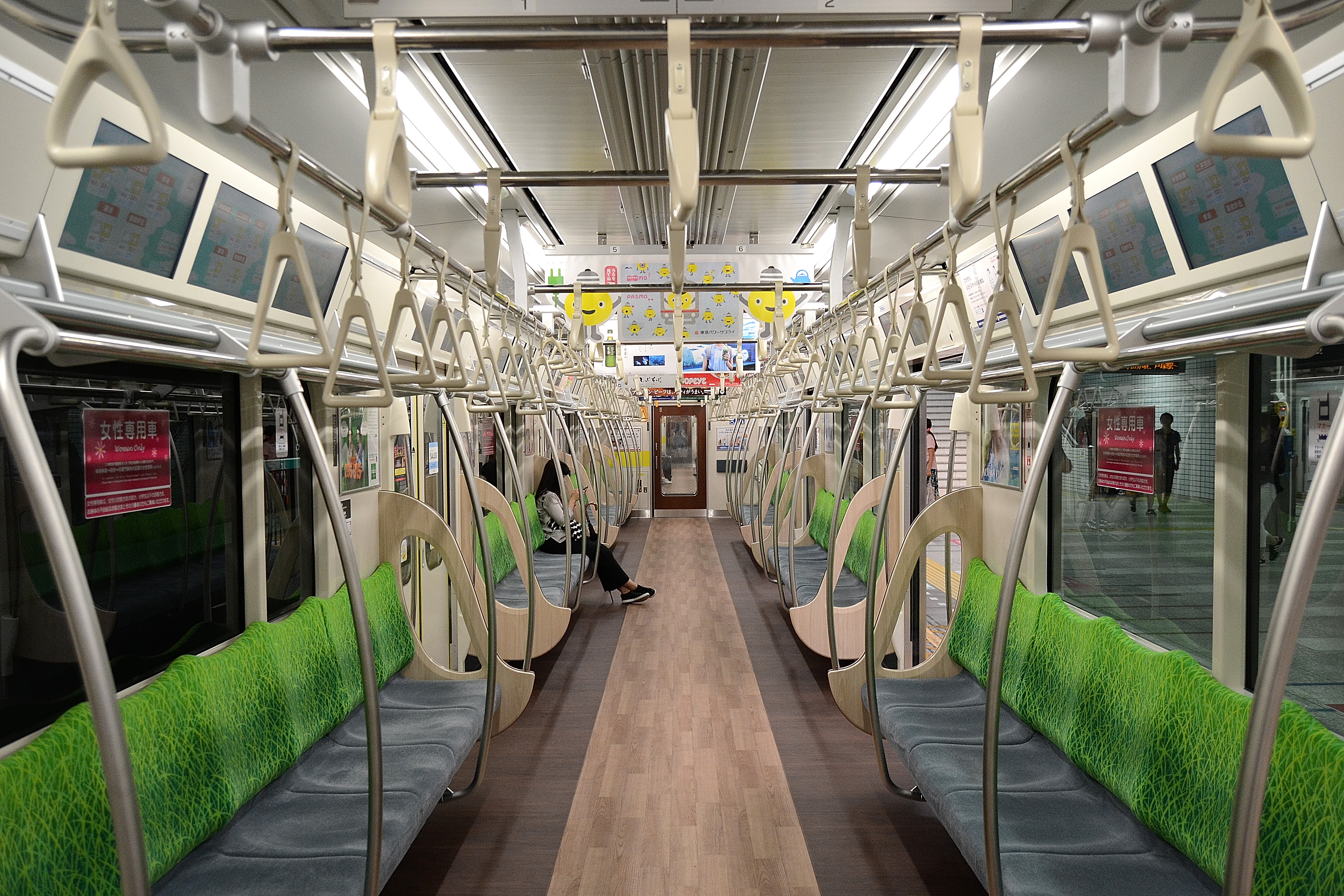
2020 series interior view

=== Formation ===
The trains are formed as follows, with five motored ("M") cars and five non-powered trailer ("T") cars, and car 1 at the Shibuya end.

| | ← Shibuya Chūō-rinkan → | | | | | | | | | |
| Car No. | 1 | 2 | 3 | 4 | 5 | 6 | 7 | 8 | 9 | 10 |
| Designation | KuHa 2120 (Tc2) | DeHa 2220 (M2) | DeHa 2320 (M1) | SaHa 2420 (T3) | SaHa 2520 (T2) | DeHa 2620 (M3) | SaHa 2720 (T1) | DeHa 2820 (M2) | DeHa 2920 (M1) | KuHa 2020 (Tc1) |
| Weight (t) | 31.5 | 33.5 | 33.5 | 27.8 | 27.5 | 32.0 | 27.5 | 33.5 | 33.5 | 31.4 |
| Capacity (total/seated) | 143/45 | 155/48 | 155/51 | 155/51 | 155/51 | 155/51 | 155/51 | 155/51 | 155/51 | 143/45 |

Cars 3 and 9 each have two single-arm pantographs, and car 6 has one.

=== Build histories ===
The manufacturers and delivery dates for the fleet are as shown below.

| Set No. | Manufacturer | Date delivered | Notes |
|---|---|---|---|
| 2121 | J-TREC, Yokohama | November 2017 | |
| 2122 | J-TREC, Niitsu | February 2018 | |
| 2123 | J-TREC, Niitsu | February 2018 | |
| 2124 | J-TREC, Niitsu | 6 June 2018 | |
| 2125 | J-TREC, Niitsu | 27 June 2018 | |
| 2126 | J-TREC, Niitsu | 30 October 2018 | Car 3 is a former 6020 series car. |
| 2127 | J-TREC, Niitsu | 5 December 2018 | Car 3 is a former 6020 series car. |
| 2128 | J-TREC, Niitsu | 6 March 2019 | |
| 2129 | J-TREC, Niitsu | 27 March 2019 | |
| 2130 | J-TREC, Niitsu | 21 August 2019 | |
| 2131 | J-TREC, Yokohama | 31 October 2019 | |
| 2132 | J-TREC, Niitsu | 17 January 2020 | |
| 2133 | J-TREC, Niitsu | 14 February 2020 | |
| 2134 | J-TREC, Niitsu | 4 March 2020 | |
| 2135 | J-TREC, Niitsu | 25 March 2020 | |
| 2136 | J-TREC, Niitsu | 15 April 2020 | |
| 2137 | J-TREC, Niitsu | 13 May 2020 | |
| 2138 | J-TREC, Yokohama | 17 September 2020 | |
| 2139 | J-TREC, Niitsu | 6 August 2020 | |
| 2140 | J-TREC, Niitsu | 2 September 2020 | |
| 2141 | J-TREC, Niitsu | 9 December 2020 | |
| 2142 | J-TREC, Niitsu | 7 January 2021 | |
| 2143 | J-TREC, Niitsu | 18 March 2021 | |
| 2144 | J-TREC, Niitsu | 15 April 2021 | |
| 2145 | J-TREC, Niitsu | 23 May 2021 | |
| 2146 | J-TREC, Niitsu | 11 June 2021 | |
| 2147 | J-TREC, Niitsu | 15 July 2021 | |
| 2148 | J-TREC, Niitsu | 26 August 2021 | |
| 2149 | J-TREC, Niitsu | 22 December 2021 | |
| 2150 | J-TREC, Niitsu | May 2022 | |

== 3020 series ==
Tokyu 3020 series
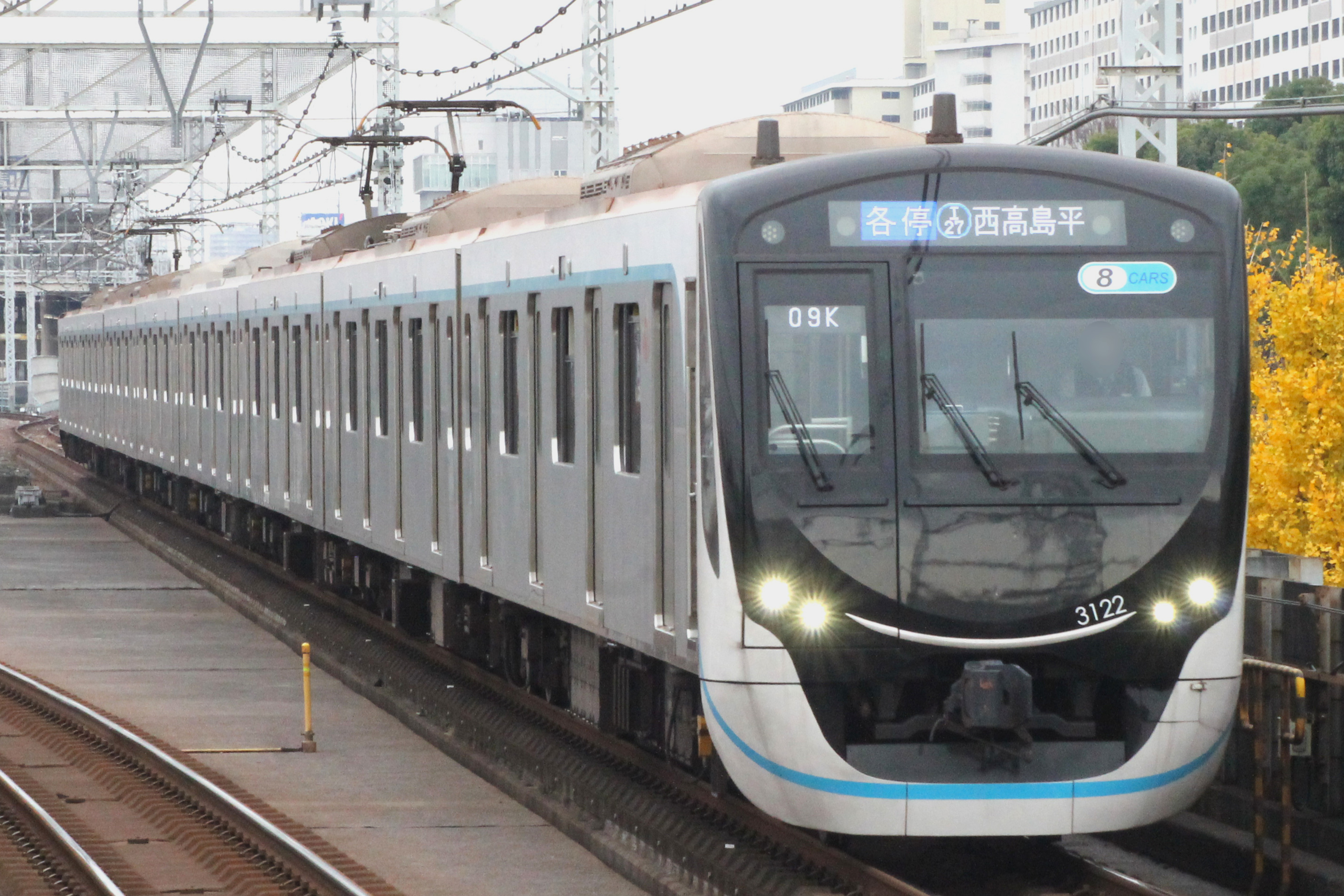
- A 3020 series train in December 2022
- Built at: Yokohama
- Constructed: 2019
- Entered service: 22 November 2019
- Number built: 24 vehicles
- Number in service: 24 vehicles (3 sets)
- Formation: 8 (originally 6) cars per trainset
- Fleet numbers: 3121–3123
- Lines served: Tokyu Meguro Line; Tokyu Shin-Yokohama Line; Tokyo Metro Namboku Line; Saitama Rapid Railway Line; Toei Mita Line; Sōtetsu Shin-Yokohama Line; Sōtetsu Main Line; Sōtetsu Izumino Line

On 26 March 2019, Tokyu Corporation announced the introduction of new 3020 series trains on their Meguro Line. The first set of eight cars was delivered in April 2019. A second set of eight cars was transferred from J-TREC in Yokohama to Nagatsuta in May 2019. Trial runs on the Den-en-toshi Line began in June 2019.

The first 3020 series set entered revenue service on 22 November 2019. Originally operating as 6-car sets, the fleet began operating as 8-car sets in April 2022.

Service commenced on the Tōkyū Shin-Yokohama Line in March 2023. As of June 2023, the 3020 series lacks equipment needed in order to through run on the Sōtetsu Shin-Yokohama Line and associated through services. Tokyu plans to install the required equipment to enable Sotetsu through service in the near future. Set 3121 had officially entered service along the Sotetsu network on 26 September 2023, over a half year later of the opening of the Sōtetsu-Tokyu Link Line.

=== Interior ===
Passenger accommodation consists of high-back seating. The trains are also fitted with security cameras and air purifiers.

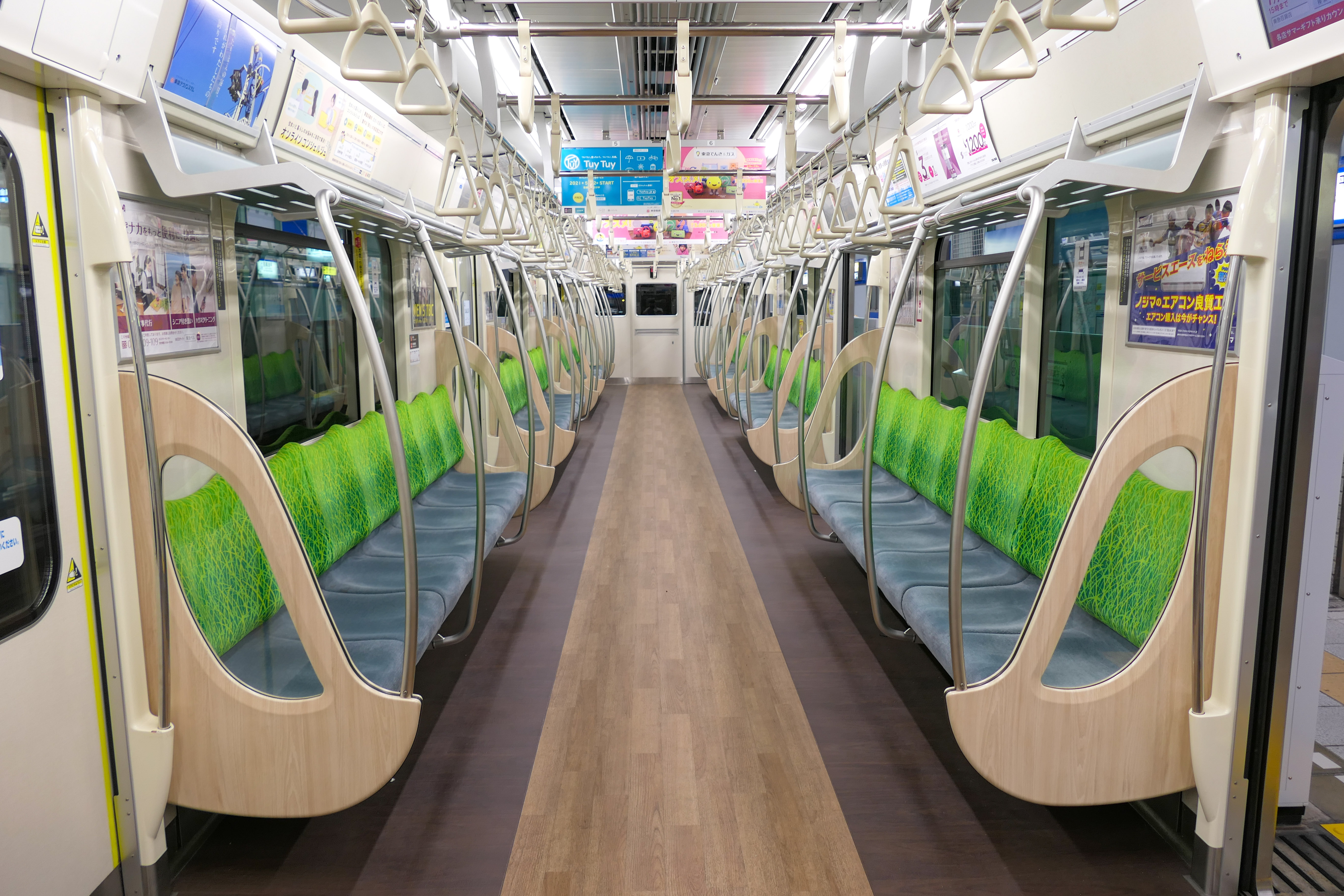
Interior view

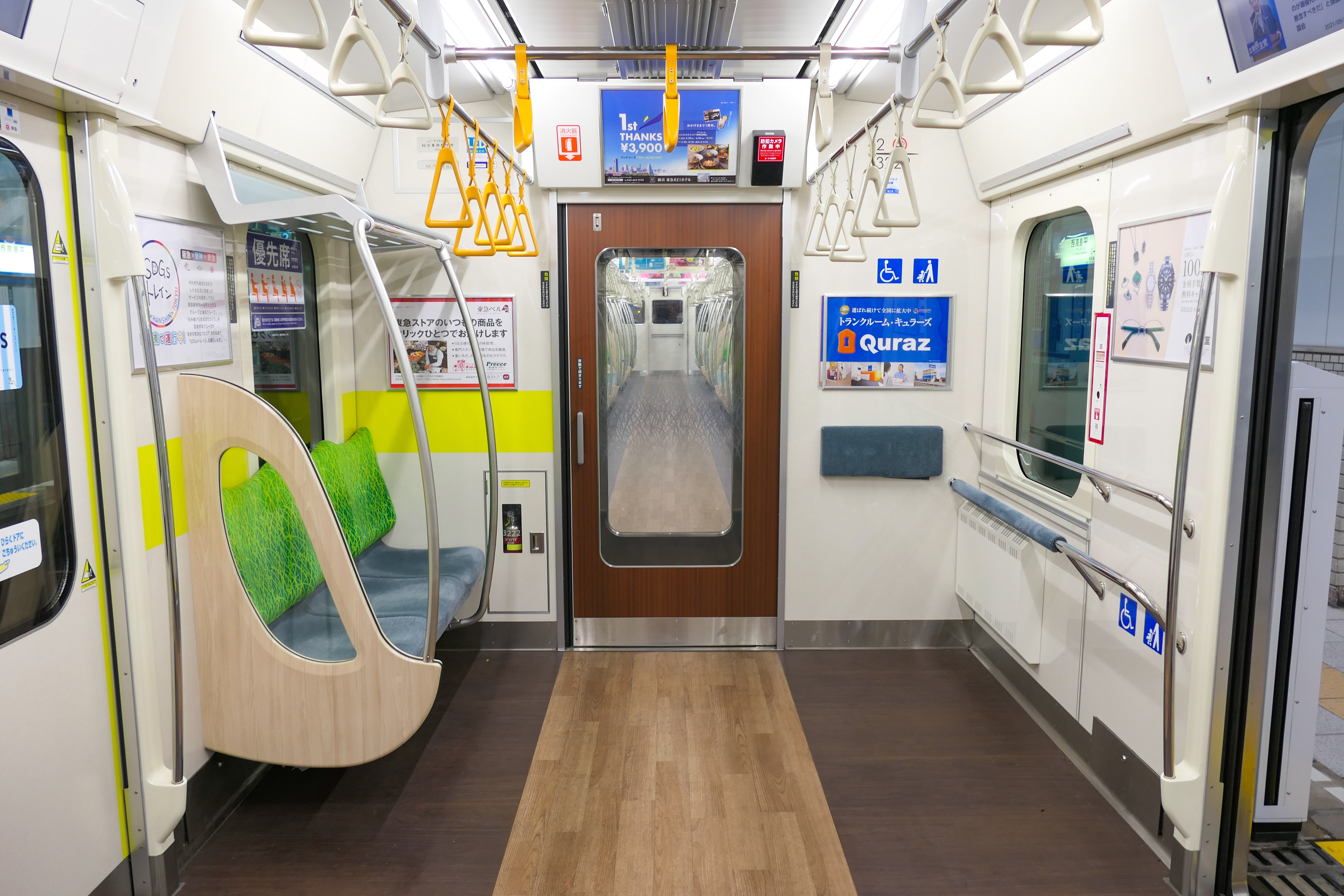
Wheelchair space (right)

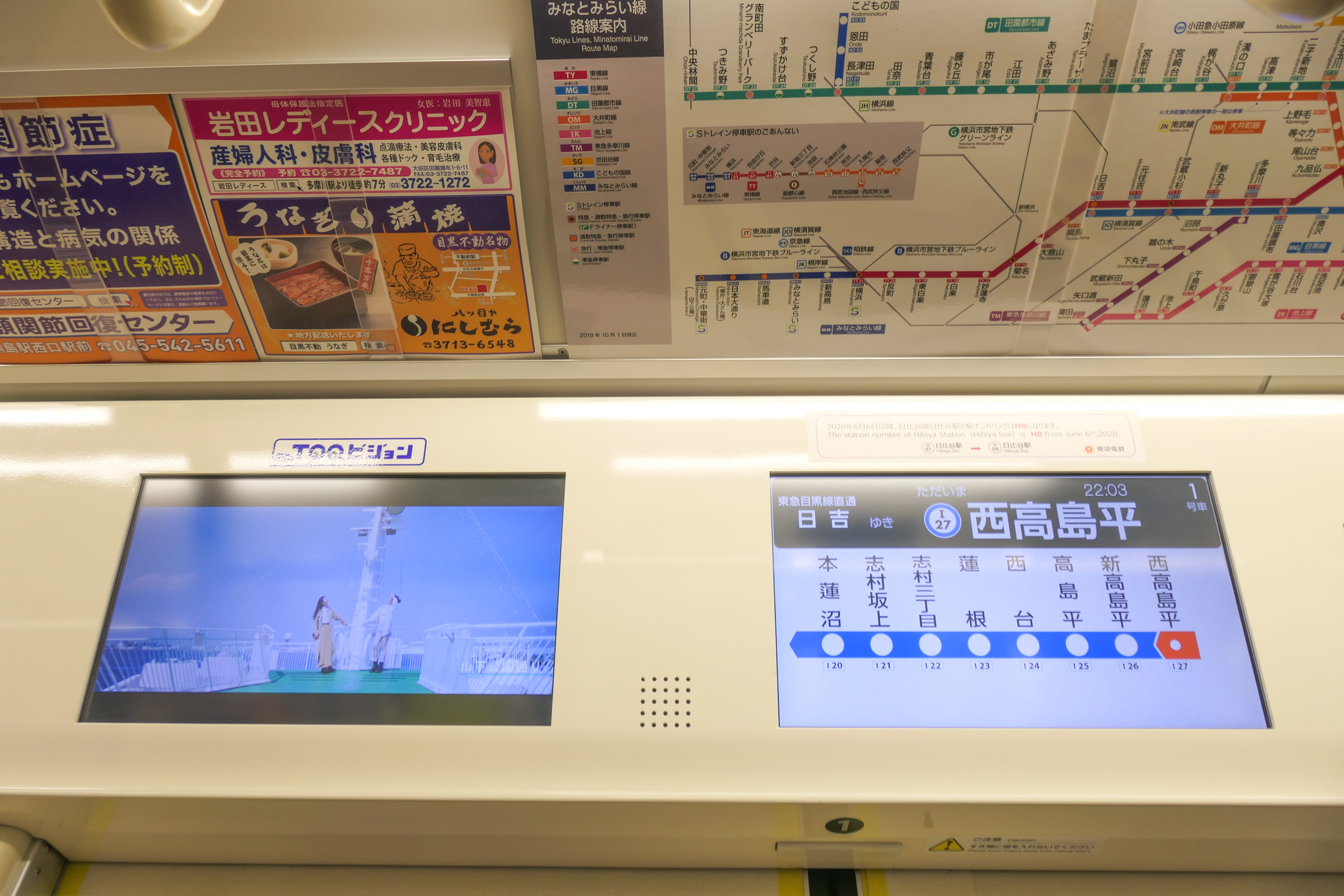
Passenger information displays

=== Formation ===
The trains are operated as eight-car sets. They were originally built as such, but were initially operated as six-car sets, with two cars per set stored until 2022, when platform doors were extended to fit 8-car trains as part of Tokyu Corporation's strategy to cope with high demand on the Meguro Line and for the opening of the Sōtetsu Tōkyū Link Line. All three trainsets are distinguished with an "8-Cars" sticker located on the front window of the first and last cars, and are formed as follows:

| | ← Meguro Hiyoshi → | | | | | | | |
| Car No. | 1 | 2 | 3 | 4 | 5 | 6 | 7 | 8 |
| Designation | KuHa 3120 (Tc2) | DeHa 3220 (M2B) | DeHa 3320 (M1B) | SaHa 3420 (T2) | SaHa 3520 (T1) | DeHa 3620 (M2A) | DeHa 3720 (M1A) | KuHa 3820 (Tc1) |
| Weight (t) | 31.5 | 33.3 | 33.3 | 27.3 | 27.3 | 33.3 | 33.3 | 31.9 |
| Capacity (total/seated) | 143/45 | 155/48 | 155/51 | 155/51 | 155/51 | 155/51 | 155/51 | 143/45 |
| Numbering | 3121 : 3123 | 3221 : 3223 | 3321 : 3323 | 3421 : 3423 | 3521 : 3523 | 3621 : 3623 | 3721 : 3723 | 3821 : 3823 |

The "M1B" and "M1A" cars are each fitted with two single-arm pantographs.

==== Initial 6-car formation ====
The original six-car formation was as follows:

| | ← Meguro Hiyoshi → | | | | | |
| Car No. | 1 | 2 | 3 | 4 | 5 | 6 |
| Designation | KuHa 3120 (Tc2) | DeHa 3220 (M2B) | DeHa 3320 (M1B) | DeHa 3620 (M2A) | DeHa 3720 (M1A) | KuHa 3820 (Tc1) |
| Weight (t) | 31.5 | 33.3 | 33.3 | 33.3 | 33.3 | 31.9 |
| Capacity (total/seated) | 143/45 | 155/48 | 155/51 | 155/51 | 155/51 | 143/45 |
| Numbering | 3121 : 3123 | 3221 : 3223 | 3321 : 3323 | 3621 : 3623 | 3721 : 3723 | 3821 : 3823 |

The "M1B" and "M1A" cars were each fitted with two single-arm pantographs.

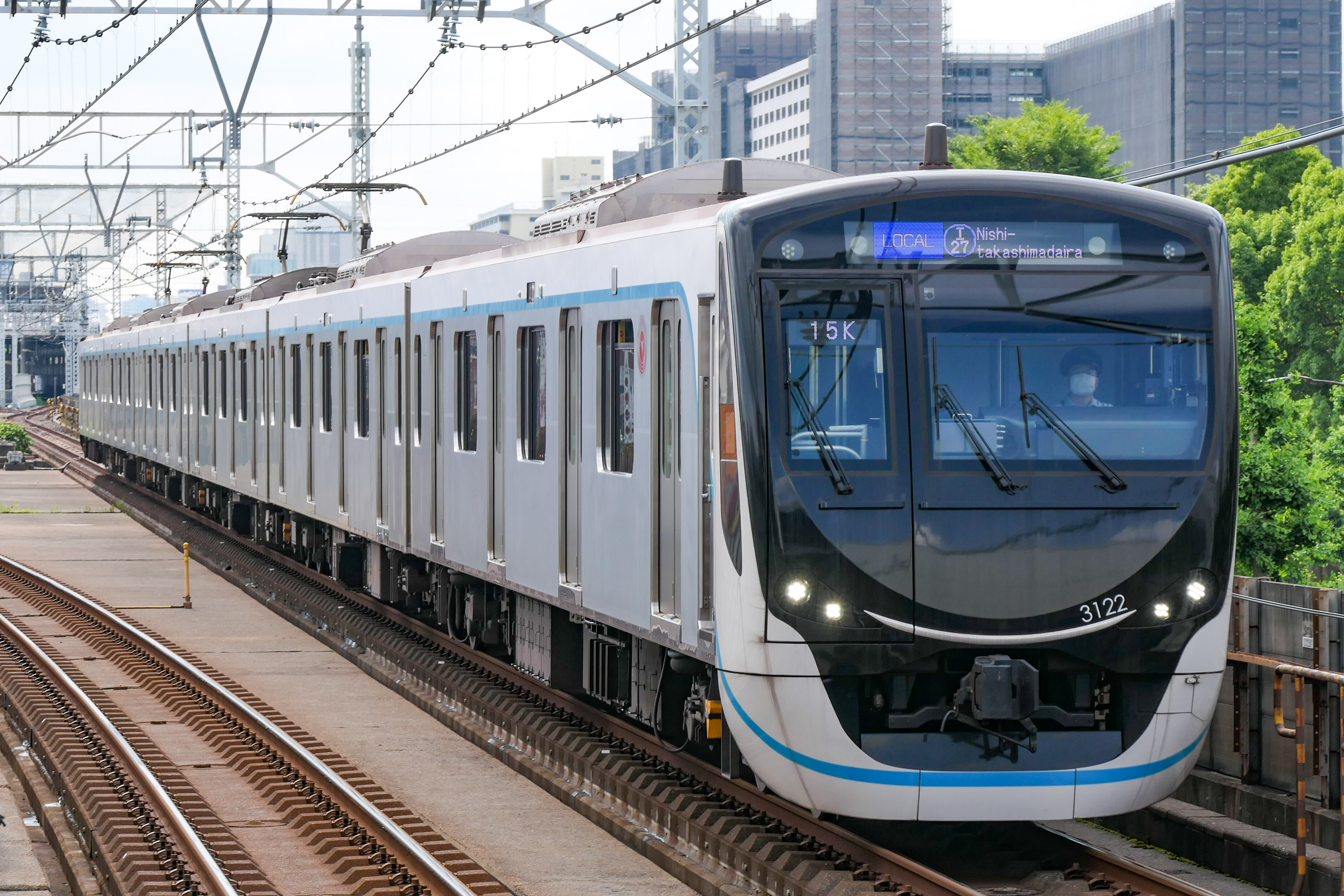
6-car set on the Toei Mita Line in June 2021

=== Build histories ===
The manufacturers and delivery dates for the fleet are as shown below.

| Set No. | Manufacturer | Date delivered |
|---|---|---|
| 3121 | J-TREC, Yokohama | April 2019 |
| 3122 | J-TREC, Yokohama | May 2019 |
| 3123 | J-TREC, Yokohama | July 2019 |

== 6020 series ==
Tokyu 6020 series
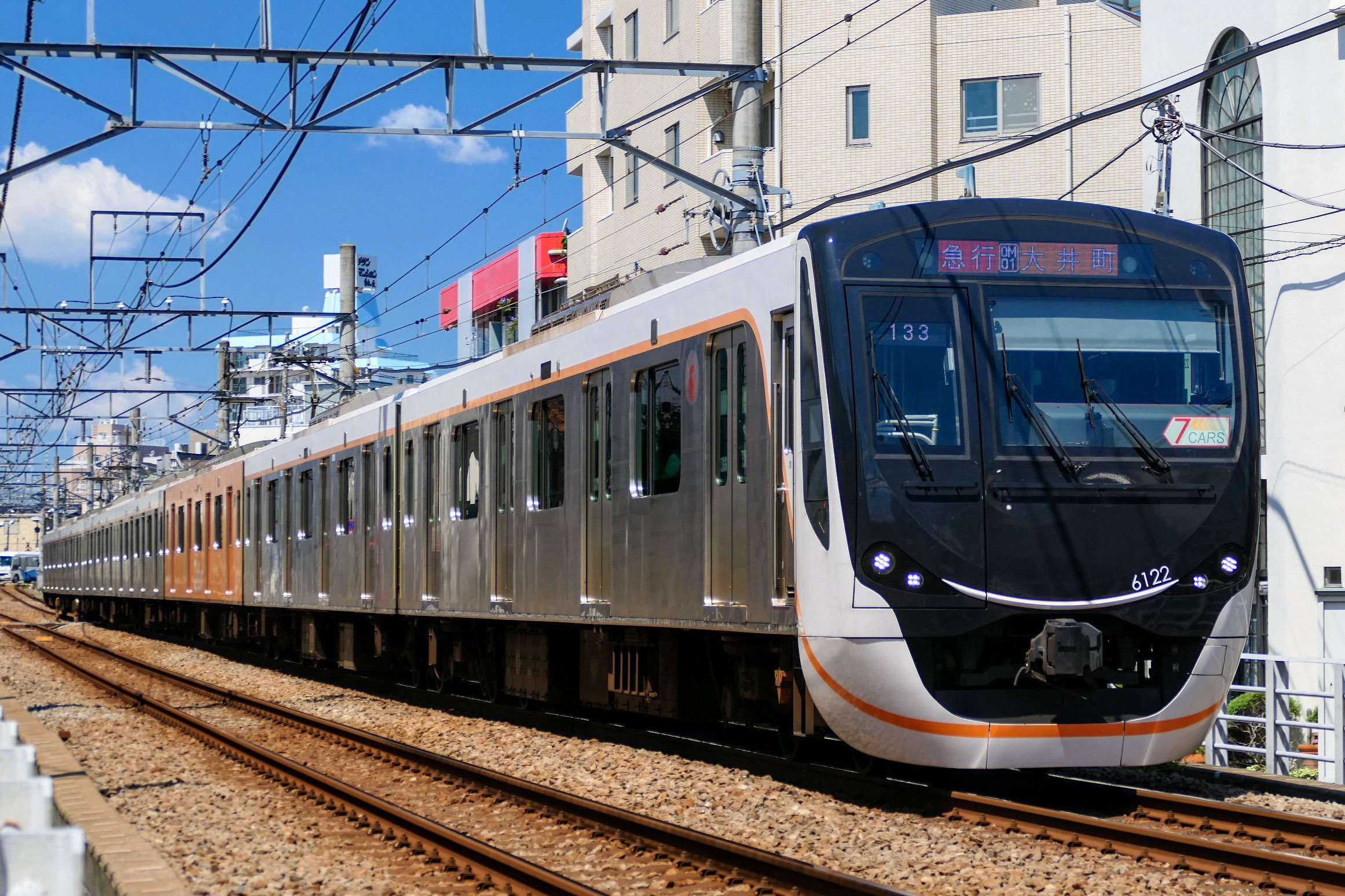
- 7-car set 6122 in service in June 2025
- In service: March 2018 – present
- Built at: Yokohama
- Replaced: 9000 series; 9020 series
- Constructed: 2017–2018, 2025–
- Entered service: 28 March 2018
- Number under construction: 85 vehicles (17 sets) on order
- Number built: 21 vehicles; 2 × 7-car; 1 × 5-car; 2 × int. car
- Number in service: 19 vehicles (3 sets)
- Formation: 5/7 cars per trainset
- Fleet numbers: 6121–6122 (7-car sets); 6151– (5-car sets)
- Lines served: Tokyu Oimachi Line; Tokyu Den-en-toshi Line

Details of the 6020 series were officially announced on 12 October 2017. The first set was delivered from the J-TREC factory in Yokohama in December 2017, followed by a second in January 2018. They entered revenue service from 28 March 2018.

In both sets, car 3 was replaced by a new-build "Q Seat" car built in October 2018. The outgoing cars were subsequently used in 2020 series sets 2126 and 2127. The Q Seat cars are usually arranged in longitudinal mode, but on specific evening express trains from Ōimachi to Nagatsuta, they are arranged in transverse mode and can be used only with a reservation by paying a small surcharge.

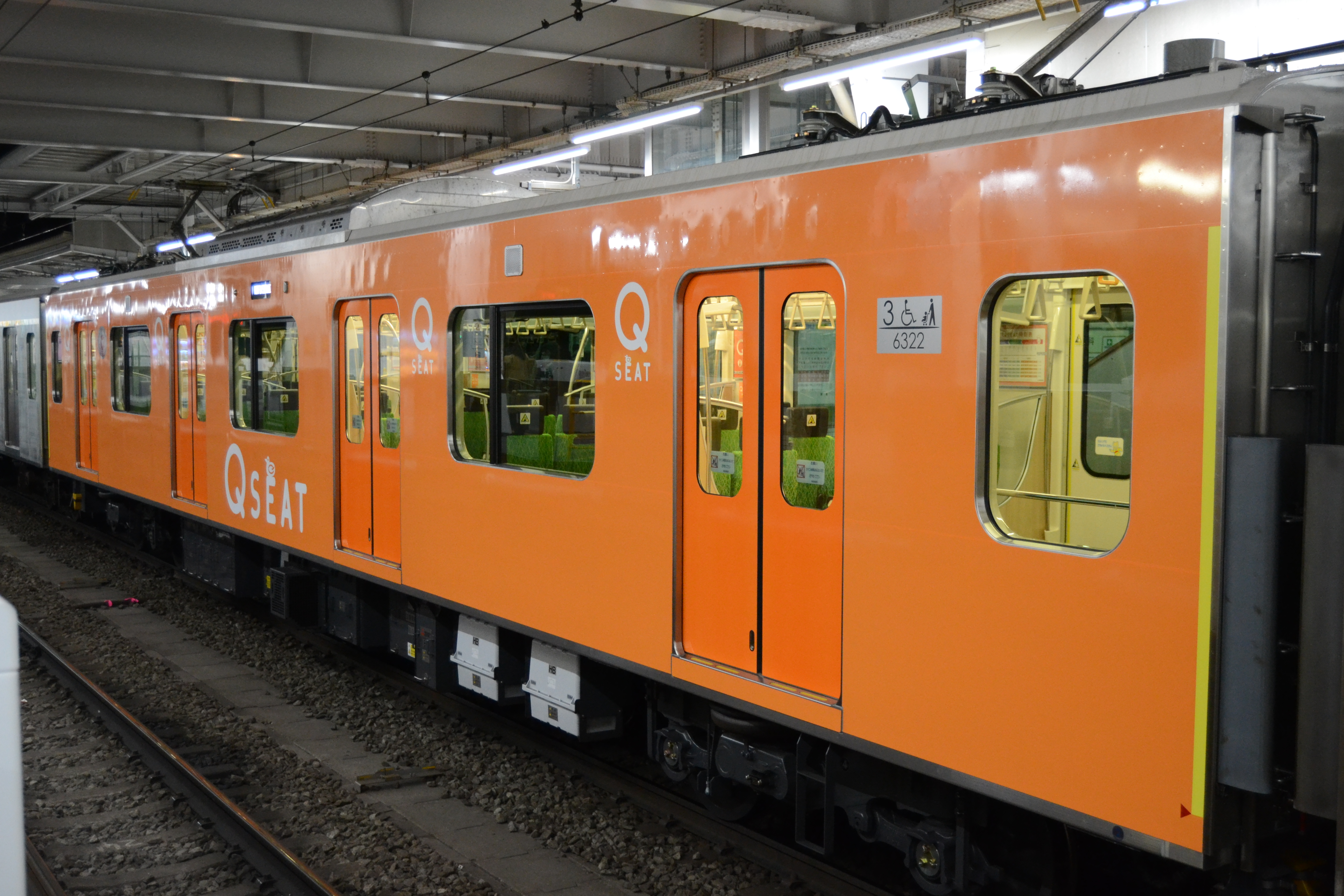
Q Seat car

=== 5-car trains ===
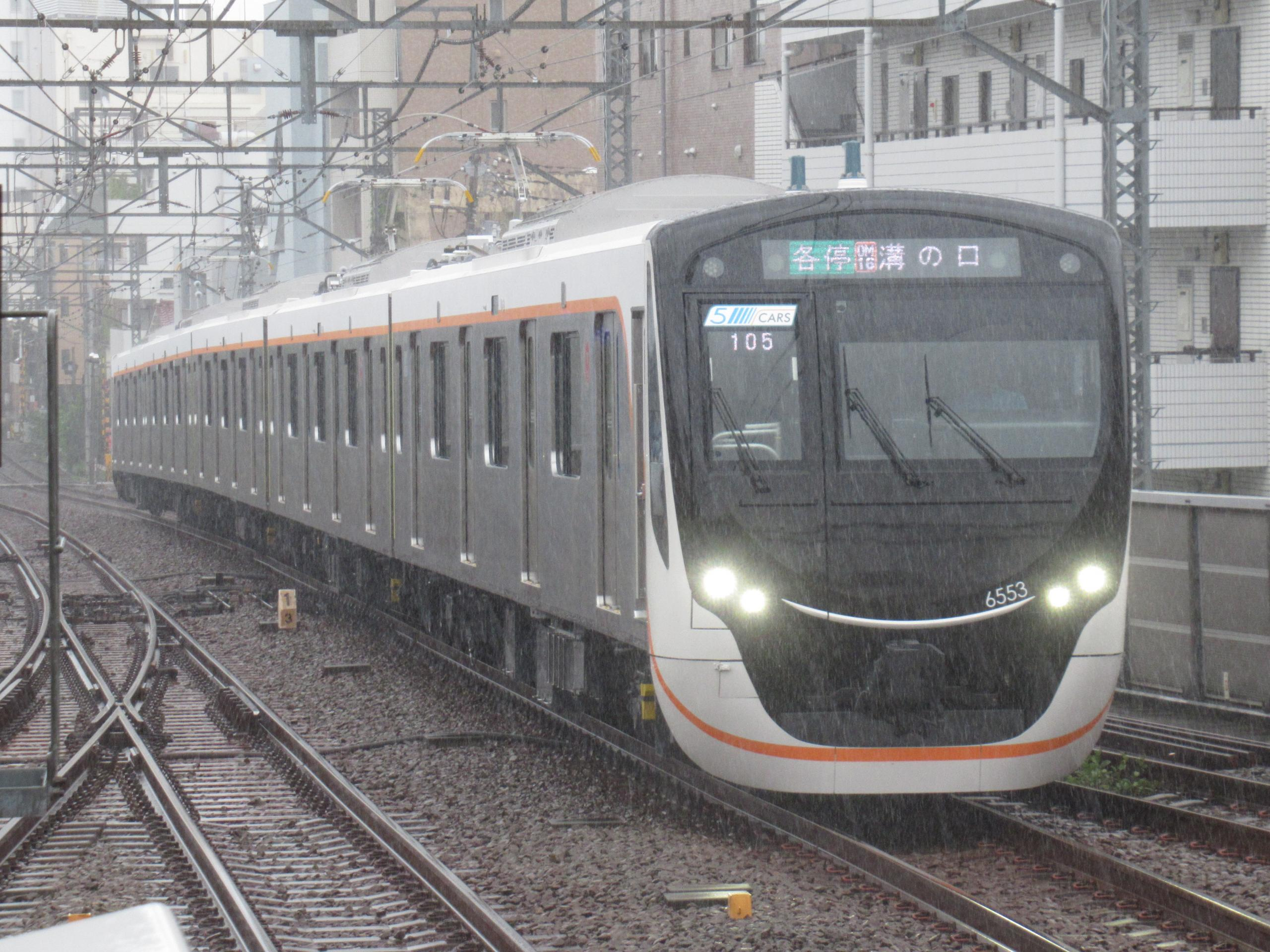
A 5-car 6020 series set in August 2025

On 28 February 2025, Tokyu announced its plans to procure eighteen 5-car 6020 series sets to replace all 9000 and 9020 series sets on local Ōimachi Line services. Tokyu states that the new trains offer approximately 40% energy savings over the 9000 series sets and allow for quieter operation. These sets feature "5 Cars" stickers on the front ends and blue stickers next to the train doors to distinguish them from the 7-car sets. The first such set, 6151, was delivered to the Nagatsuta depot in March of that year. The 5-car fleet entered revenue service on 2 July 2025.

=== Interior ===
Passenger accommodation consists of high-back longitudinal seating throughout, except car 3 in 7-car sets, which is a "Q Seat" car that features rotating pairs of seats that can be arranged in longitudinal mode or transverse mode. Security cameras are installed in the cars.

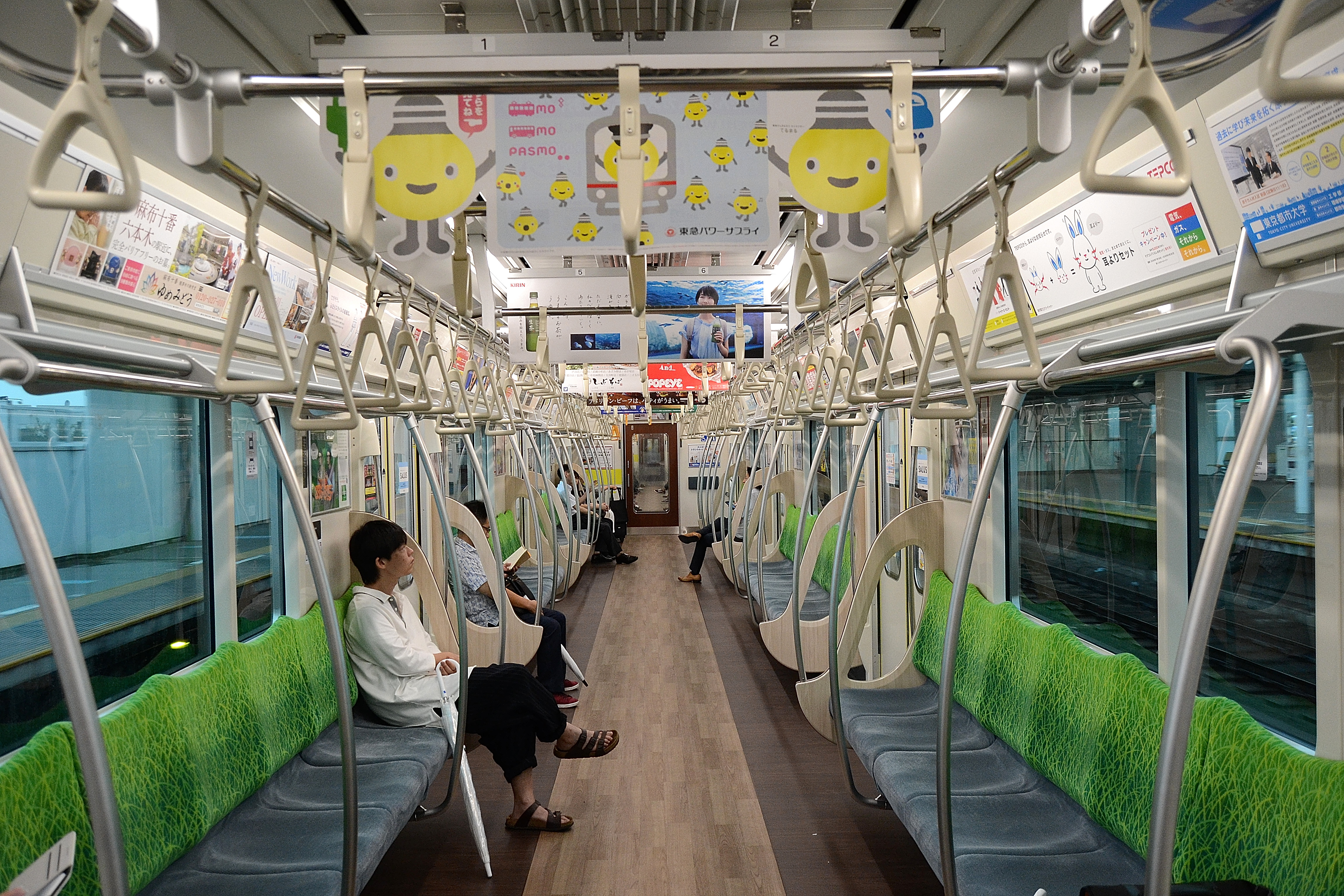
Interior view

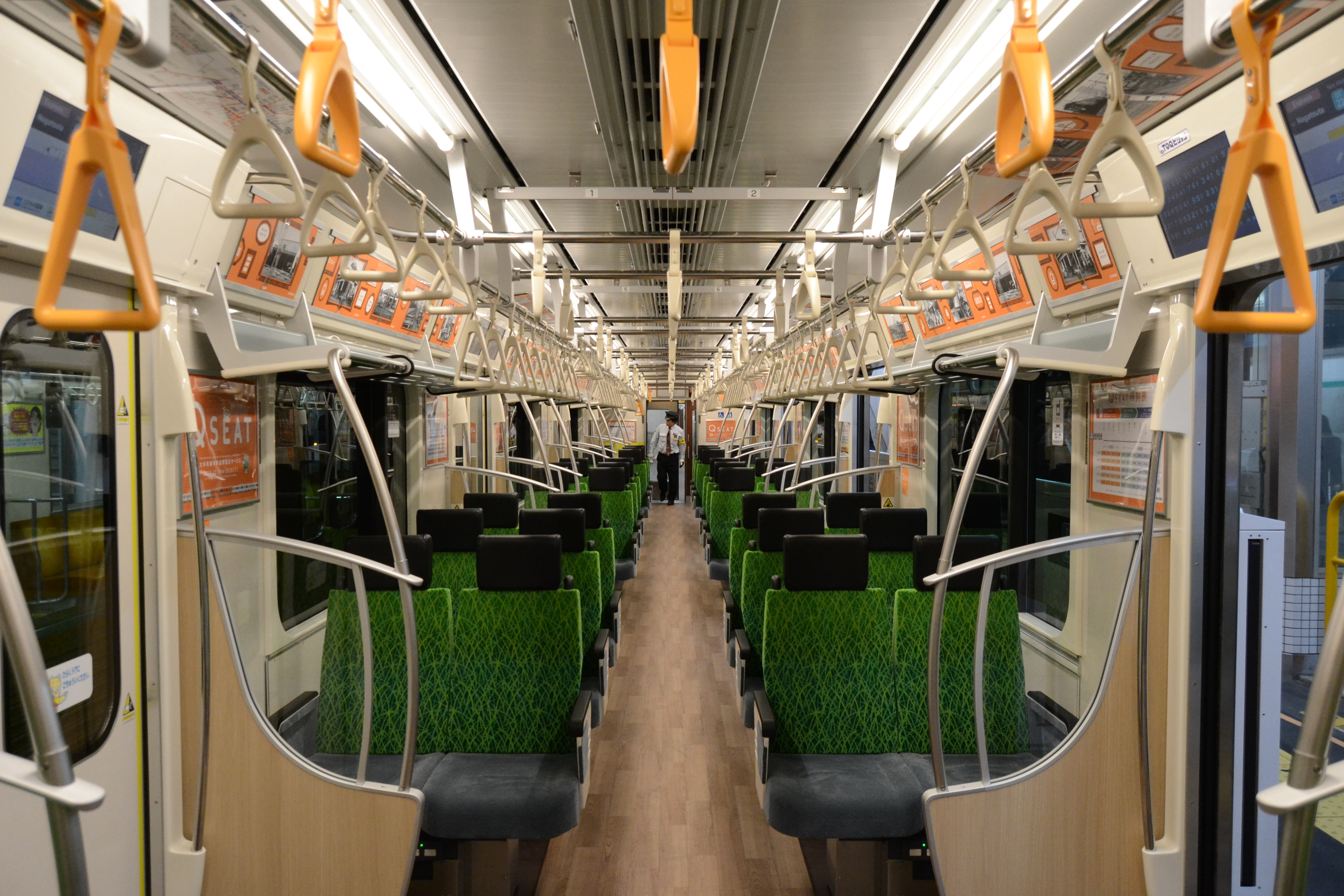
Interior view of a Q Seat car

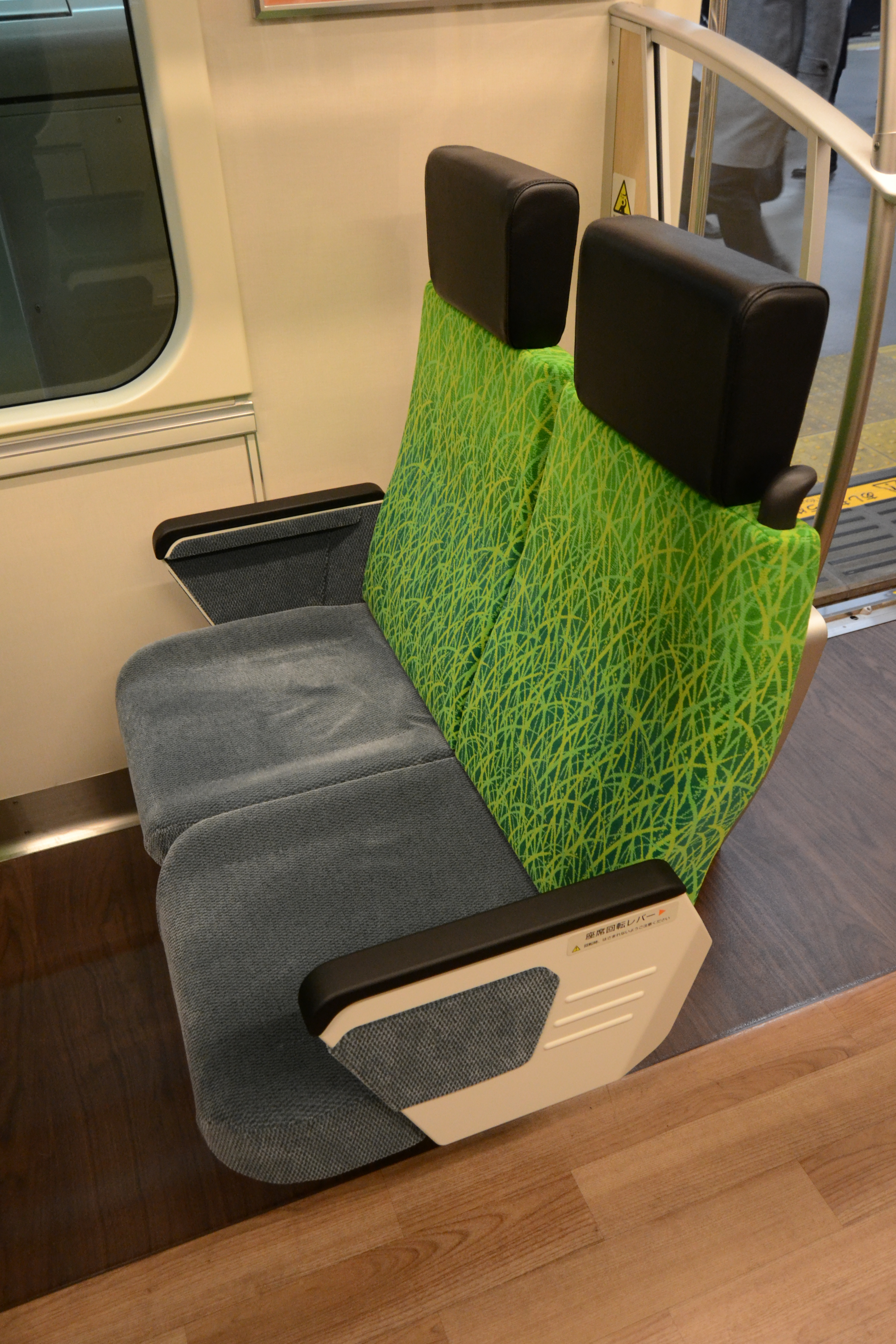
Rotating seat

=== Formations ===
==== 7-car sets ====
The 7-car sets are formed as follows:

| | ← Ōimachi Mizonokuchi, Nagatsuta → | | | | | | |
| Car No. | 1 | 2 | 3 | 4 | 5 | 6 | 7 |
| Designation | KuHa 6120 (Tc2) | DeHa 6220 (M2B) | DeHa 6320 (M1L) | SaHa 6420 (T1) | DeHa 6520 (M2A) | DeHa 6620 (M1A) | KuHa 6720 (Tc1) |

Cars 3 and 6 are each fitted with two single-arm pantographs.

==== 5-car sets ====
The 5-car sets are formed as follows:

| | ← Ōimachi Mizonokuchi, Nagatsuta → | | | | |
| Car No. | 1 | 2 | 3 | 4 | 5 |
| Designation | KuHa 6120 (Tc2) | DeHa 6220 (M3) | DeHa 6320 (M2) | DeHa 6420 (M1) | KuHa 6520 (Tc1) |
| Capacity (total/seated) | 143/45 | 155/48 | 155/51 | 155/51 | 143/45 |

==== Former formations ====
The 7-car sets were originally formed as follows:

| | ← Ōimachi Mizonokuchi, Nagatsuta → | | | | | | |
| Car No. | 1 | 2 | 3 | 4 | 5 | 6 | 7 |
| Designation | KuHa 6120 (Tc2) | DeHa 6220 (M2B) | DeHa 6320 (M1B) | SaHa 6420 (T1) | DeHa 6520 (M2A) | DeHa 6620 (M1A) | KuHa 6720 (Tc1) |
| Weight (t) | 31.2 | 33.3 | 33.3 | 27.3 | 33.3 | 33.3 | 31.4 |
| Capacity (total/seated) | 143/45 | 155/48 | 155/51 | 155/51 | 155/51 | 155/51 | 143/45 |

Cars 3 and 6 were each fitted with two single-arm pantographs.

=== Build histories ===
The manufacturers and delivery dates for the fleet are as shown below.

| Set No. | Manufacturer | Date delivered |
|---|---|---|
| 6121 | J-TREC, Yokohama | December 2017 |
| 6122 | J-TREC, Yokohama | January 2018 |
| 6151 | | March 2025 |

== Special liveries ==
On 10 April 2022, 3020 series set 3121 received a special livery to commemorate the 100th anniversary of Tokyu Corporation's founding. A 2020 series set is also due to receive the commemorative livery from 17 April.

On 17 April 2023, 3020 series set 3122 received a colorful rainbow Sustainable Development Goals (SDGs) livery.
