= Tokyu 9000 series =

Japanese electric multiple unit train type

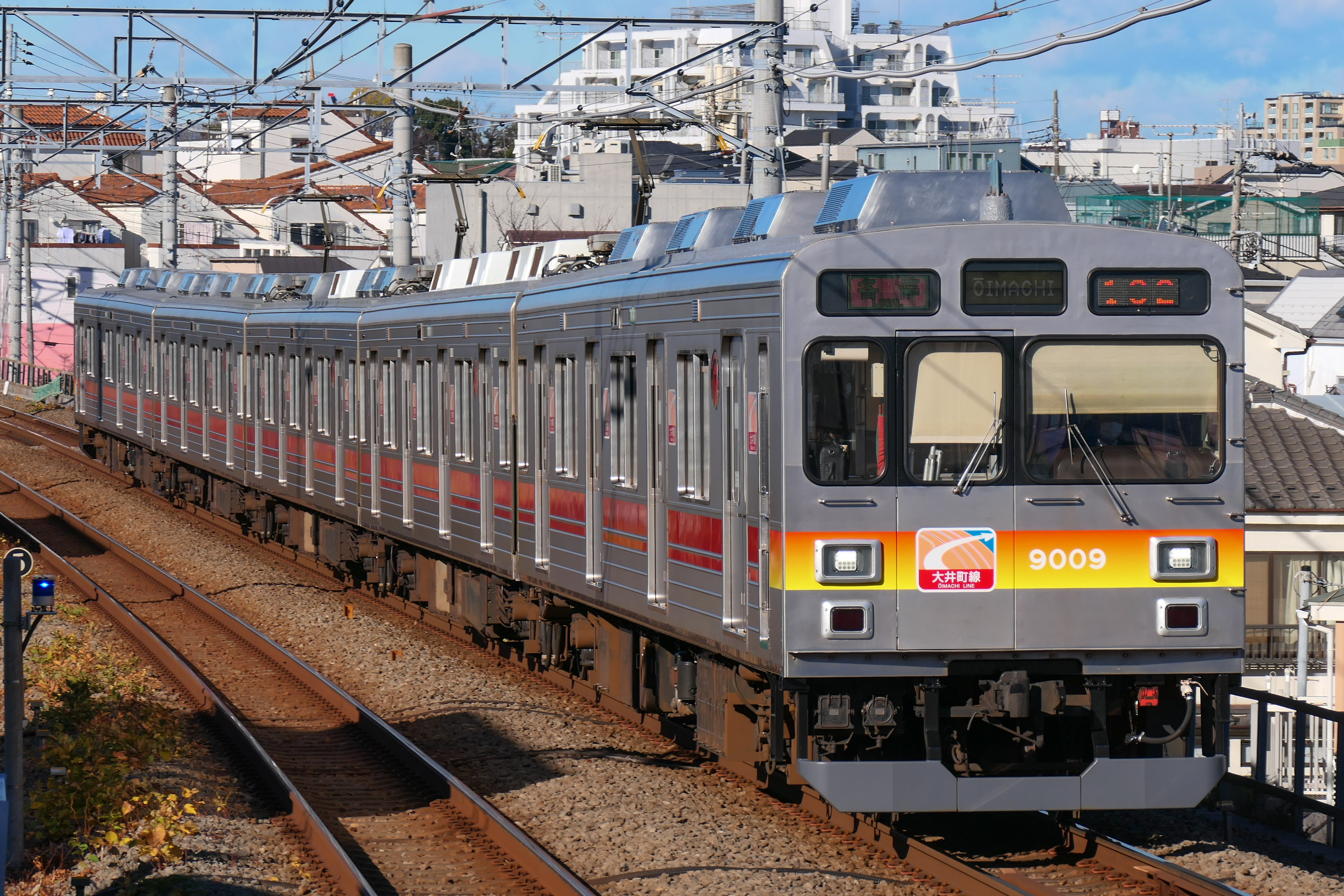
- Set 9009 on the Oimachi Line in December 2021
- In service: 1986 – present
- Manufacturer: Tokyu Car Corporation
- Constructed: 1986–1991
- Entered service: 9 March 1986; 40 years ago
- Refurbished: 2004–present
- Number built: 117 vehicles (15 sets)
- Number in service: 75 vehicles (15 sets)
- Formation: 5 (formerly 8) cars per trainset
- Fleet numbers: 9001–9015
- Operators: Tokyu Corporation; Future: Seibu Railway
- Depots: Motosumiyoshi (1986–2013); Nagatsuta (1988–present)
- Lines served: Tokyu Oimachi Line (1988–present); Tokyu Toyoko Line (1986–2013); Minatomirai Line (2004–2013)

Specifications
- Car body construction: Stainless steel
- Car length: 20 m (65 ft 7 in)
- Width: 2.8 m (9 ft 2 in)
- Doors: 4 pairs per side
- Traction system: Variable frequency (2-level GTO–VVVF)
- Power output: 170 kW (230 hp) per motor
- Electric system: 1,500 V DC overhead
- Current collection: Pantograph
- Track gauge: 1,067 mm (3 ft 6 in)

The Tokyu 9000 series (Japanese: 東急9000系, Hepburn: Tōkyū 9000-kei) is a Japanese commuter electric multiple unit (EMU) train type operated by the private railway operator Tokyu Corporation in the Tokyo area of Japan. Introduced into service in March 1986, 14 eight-car sets and a five-car set were built between 1986 and 1991 by Tokyu Car Corporation for use on the Tokyu Toyoko and Oimachi lines. Between 2009 and 2013, the 9000 series sets, allocated to Toyoko Line operations, were transferred to the Oimachi Line.

== Design ==
Cars are 20 metres (66 ft) long, 2.8 m (9 ft 2 in) wide, and have four pairs of doors per side. While they retain the stainless steel bodies used by older Tokyu train types, they have an offset front-end door. In addition, the 9000 series was the first train type to use variable-frequency drive (VFD) technology from new. Since its introduction in 1986, all subsequent Tokyu train types have implemented the technology.

The design of the 9000 series was the basis for the later Tokyu 1000 series and 2000 series train types.

== Formations ==
=== Toyoko Line ===
The Toyoko Line fleet consisted of 14 eight-car sets, formed as follows.

	← ShibuyaMotomachi–Chukagai →							
Designation	KuHa 9000 (Tc2)	DeHa 9200 (M)	SaHa 9700 (T2)	DeHa 9300 (M)	SaHa 9800 (T1)	DeHa 9400 (M)	DeHa 9600 (M0)	KuHa 9100 (Tc1)
Numbering	9001 : 9006	9201 : 9206	9701 : 9706	9301 : 9306	9801 : 9806	9401 : 9406	9601 : 9606	9101 : 9106
Numbering	9008 : 9015	9208 : 9215	9708 : 9715	9308 : 9315	9808 : 9815	9408 : 9415	9608 : 9615	9108 : 9115

- The motored cars were each fitted with one lozenge-type pantograph.

=== Oimachi Line ===
Oimachi Line sets are formed as follows.

	← MizonokuchiOimachi →				
Car No.	5	4	3	2	1
Designation	KuHa 9000 (Tc2)	DeHa 9200 (M)	DeHa 9400 (M)	DeHa 9600 (M)	KuHa 9100 (Tc1)
Wheel arrangement (AAR)	2-2	B-B	B-B	B-B	2-2
Numbering	9001 : 9015	9201 : 9215	9401 : 9415	9601 : 9615	9101 : 9115

- Cars 2, 3, and 4 are each fitted with one single-arm pantograph.

== Interior ==
Passenger accommodation consists primarily of longitudinal seating. Priority seating is composed of transverse seating bays.

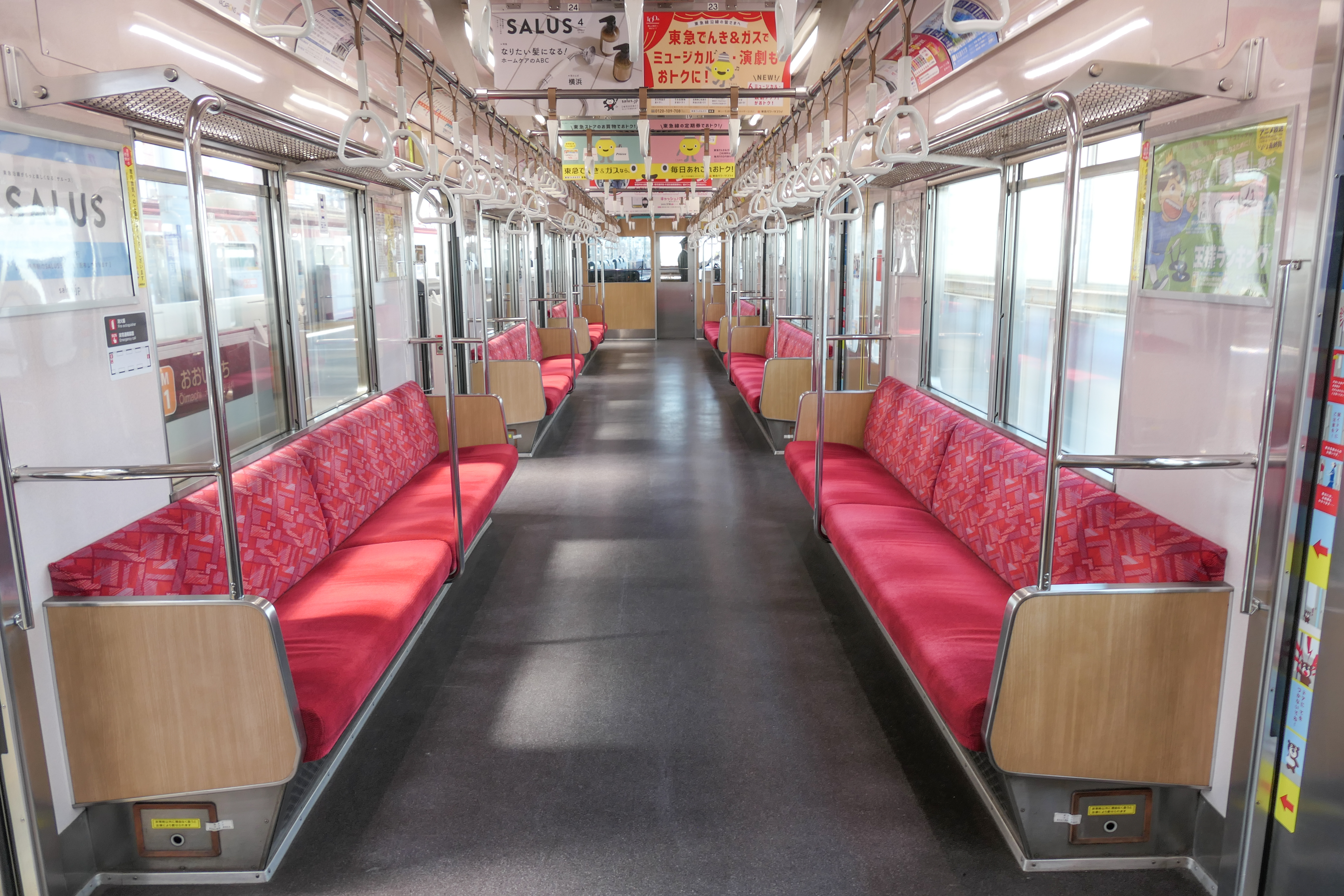
Interior view

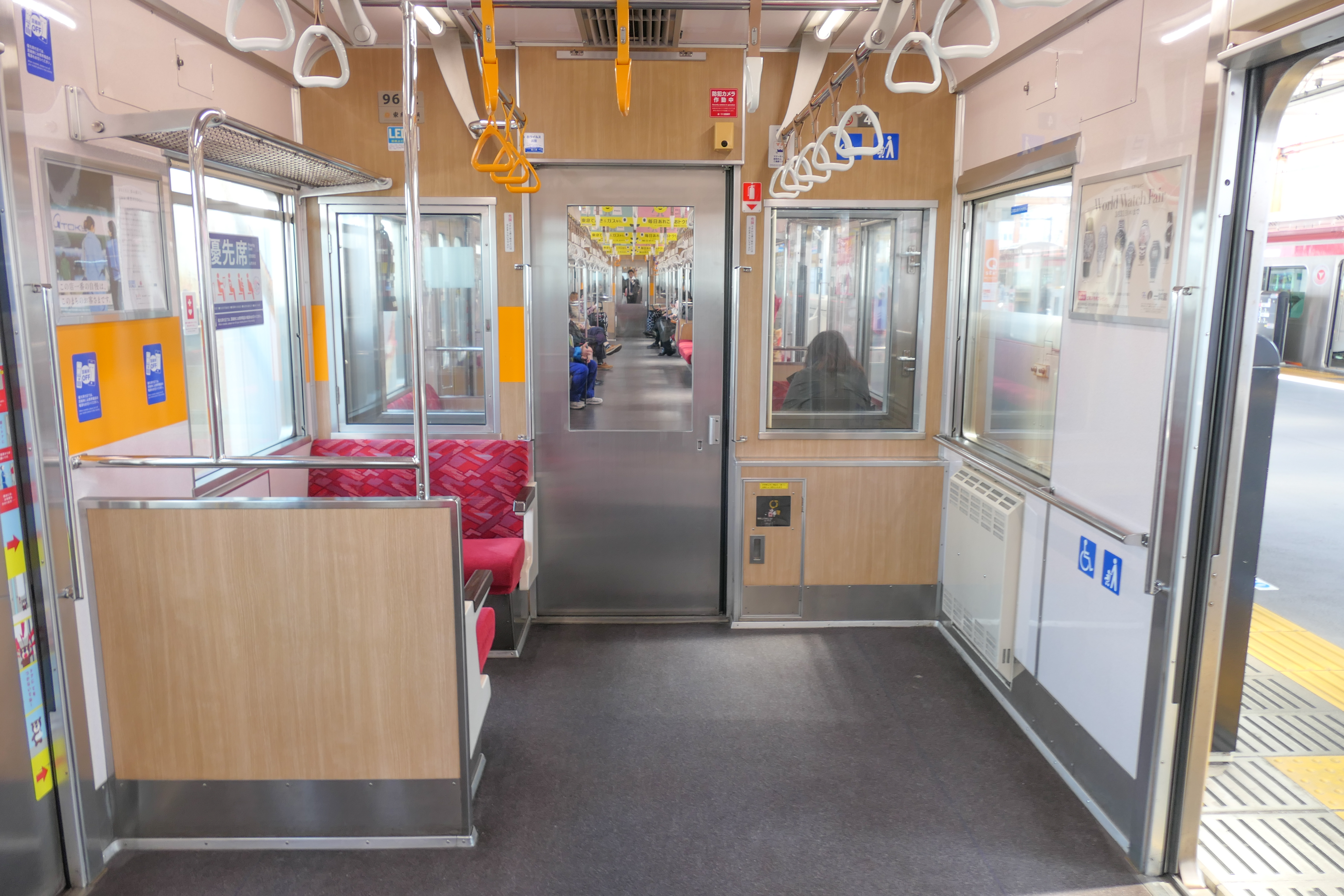
Priority seating

== History ==
The 9000 series fleet consists of 117 vehicles which were built by Tokyu Car Corporation. Construction commenced in 1986 and continued until 1991. The vehicles were initially formed into 14 eight-car sets and a five-car set, numbered 9001 to 9015. The train type first entered service on the Tokyu Toyoko Line in March 1986, and the sole five-car set (9007) was introduced on the Tokyu Oimachi Line in 1988.

=== Refurbishment ===
From fiscal 2004, the 9000 series fleet underwent a programme of interior refurbishment. The programme included the removal of intermediate partitions in favour of stanchion poles for seven-person seats, installation of onboard passenger information displays, and replacement of the original mixture of brown and orange seat moquette. The seat backs received patterned moquette, whereas the seats received plain red moquette.

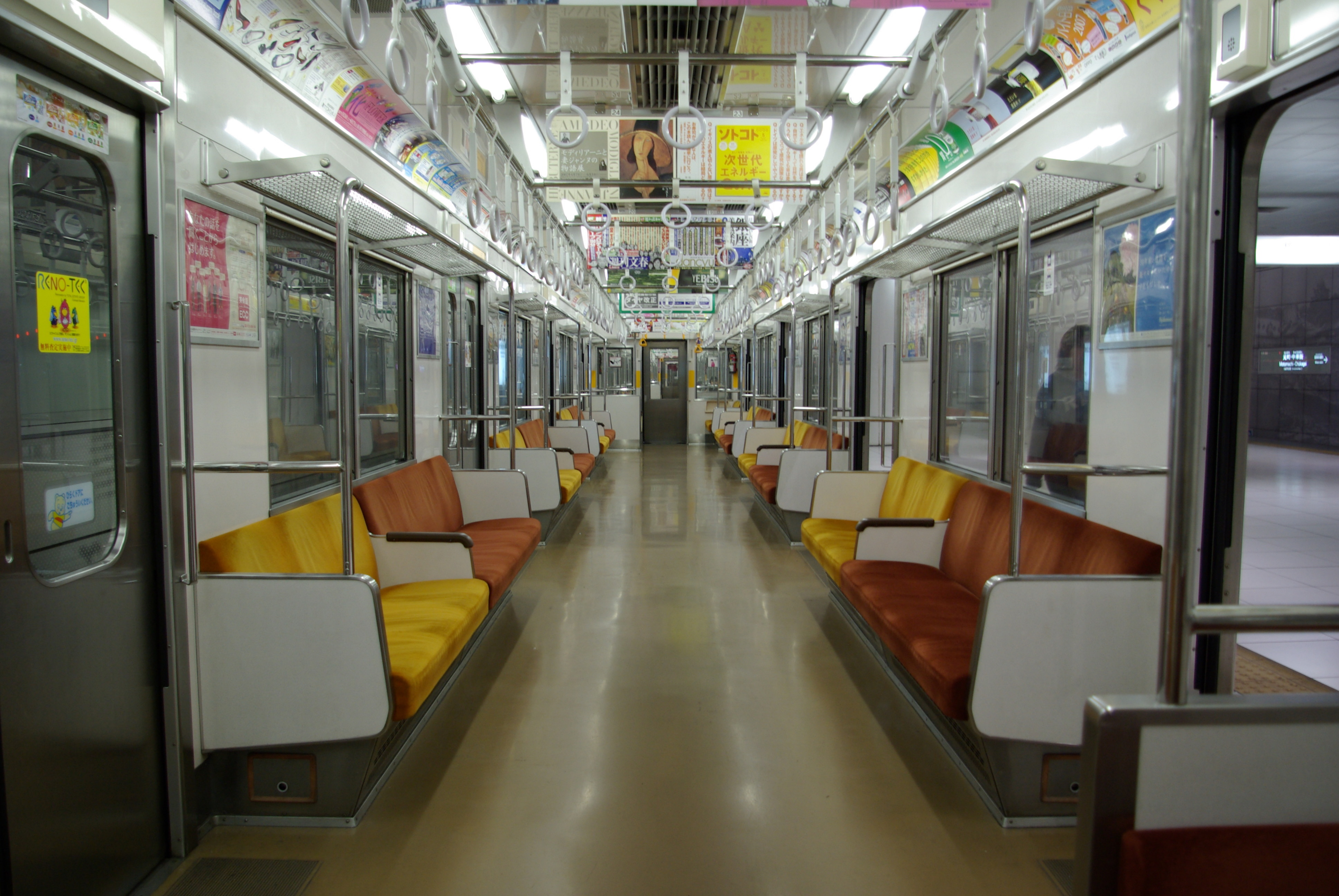
The interior of a 9000 series set in as-built condition

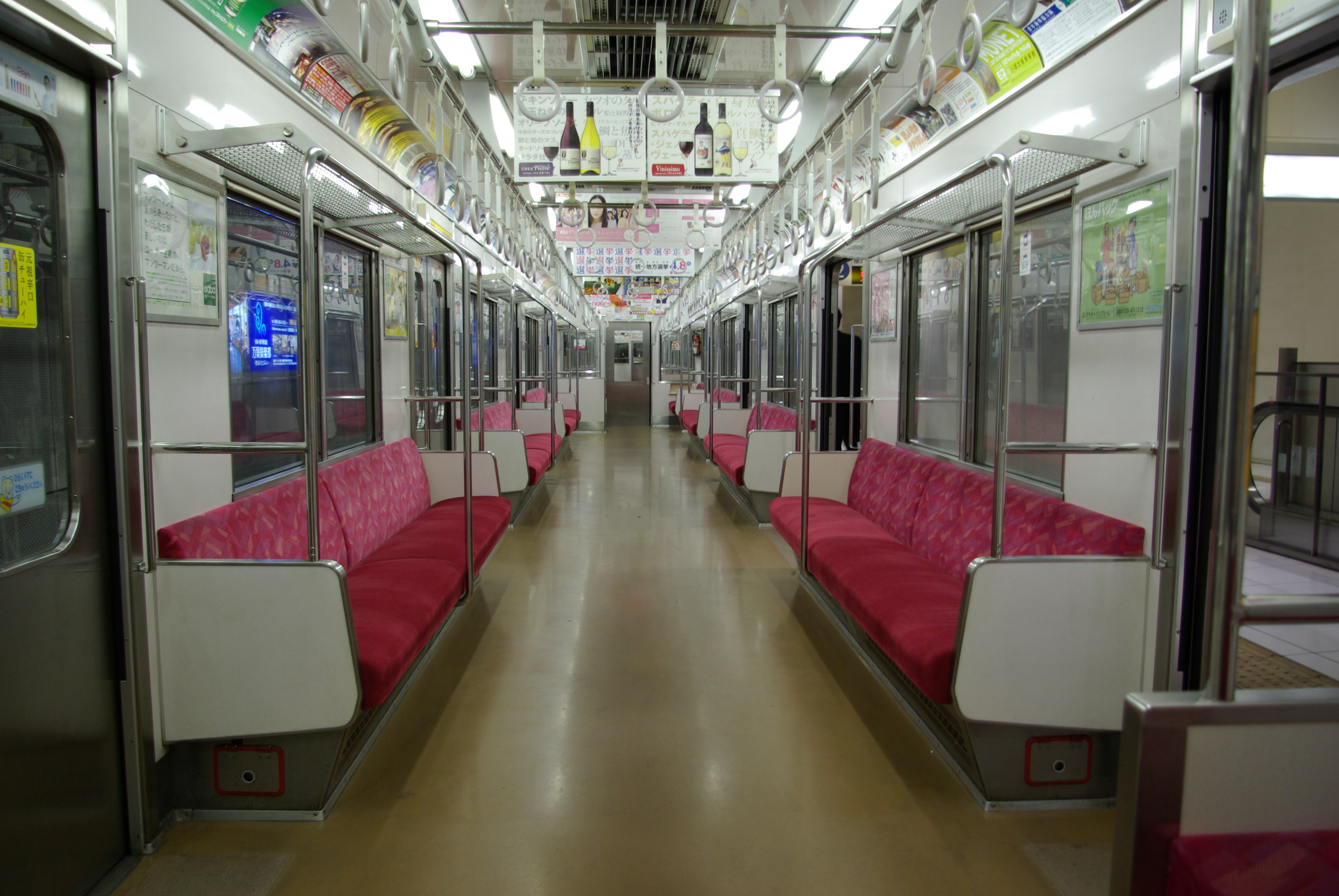
The interior of a refurbished 9000 series set

=== Transfer to the Tokyu Oimachi Line ===
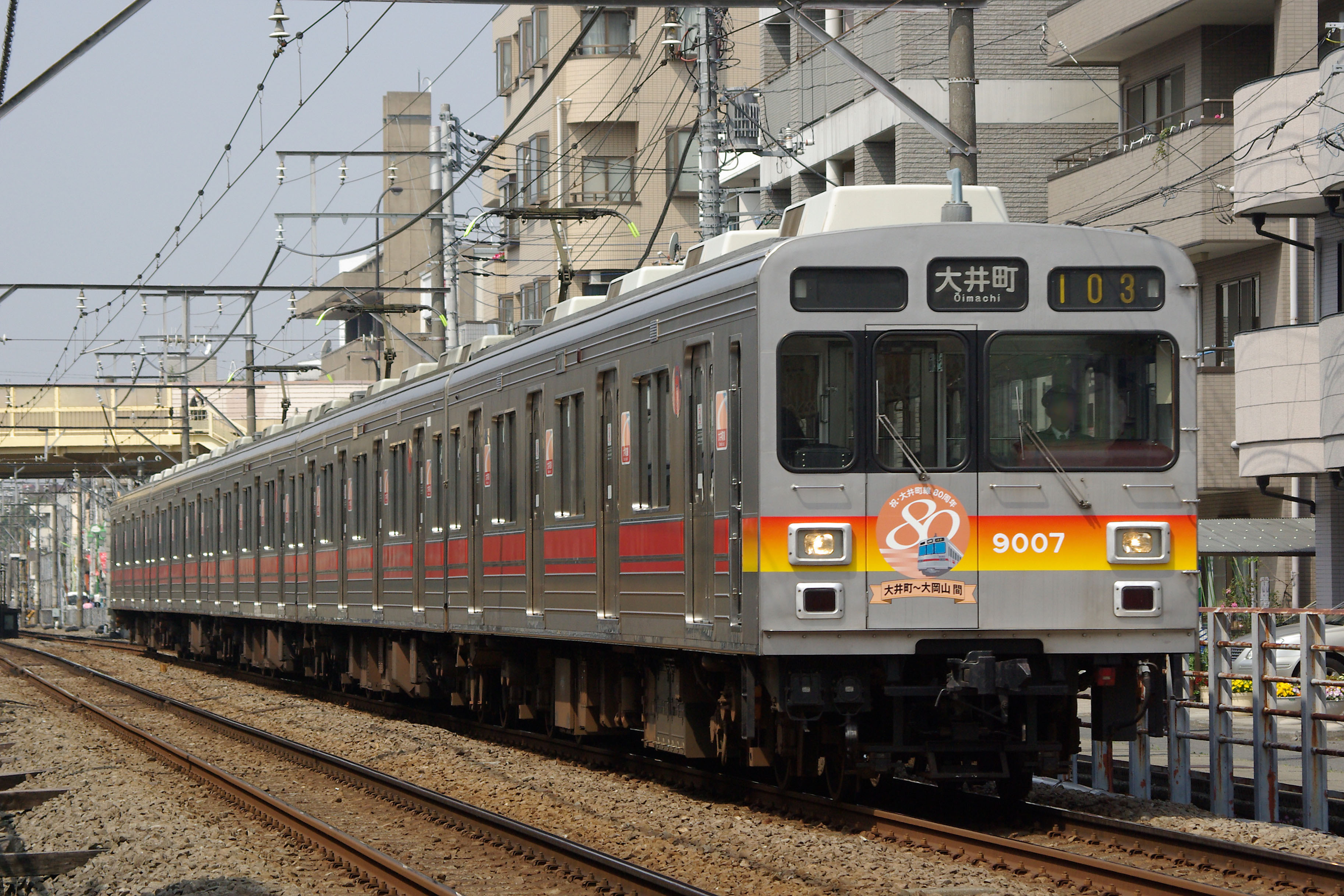
5-car set 9007 with Oimachi Line-colored front-end band, March 2008

Set 9007 was the only 9000 series trainset on the Oimachi Line until July 2009, when eight-car set 9002 was transferred from Motosumiyoshi depot to Nagatsuta depot for use on the line. It was shortened to a five-car formation, and its solid-red front-end bands were replaced with ones with a red-to-orange gradient. The rest of the fleet was transferred and modified as such from then, with the last of these sets—9001, 9005, and 9010—being withdrawn from Toyoko Line operations between 14 and 15 March 2013. They were transferred to Nagatsuta shortly thereafter.

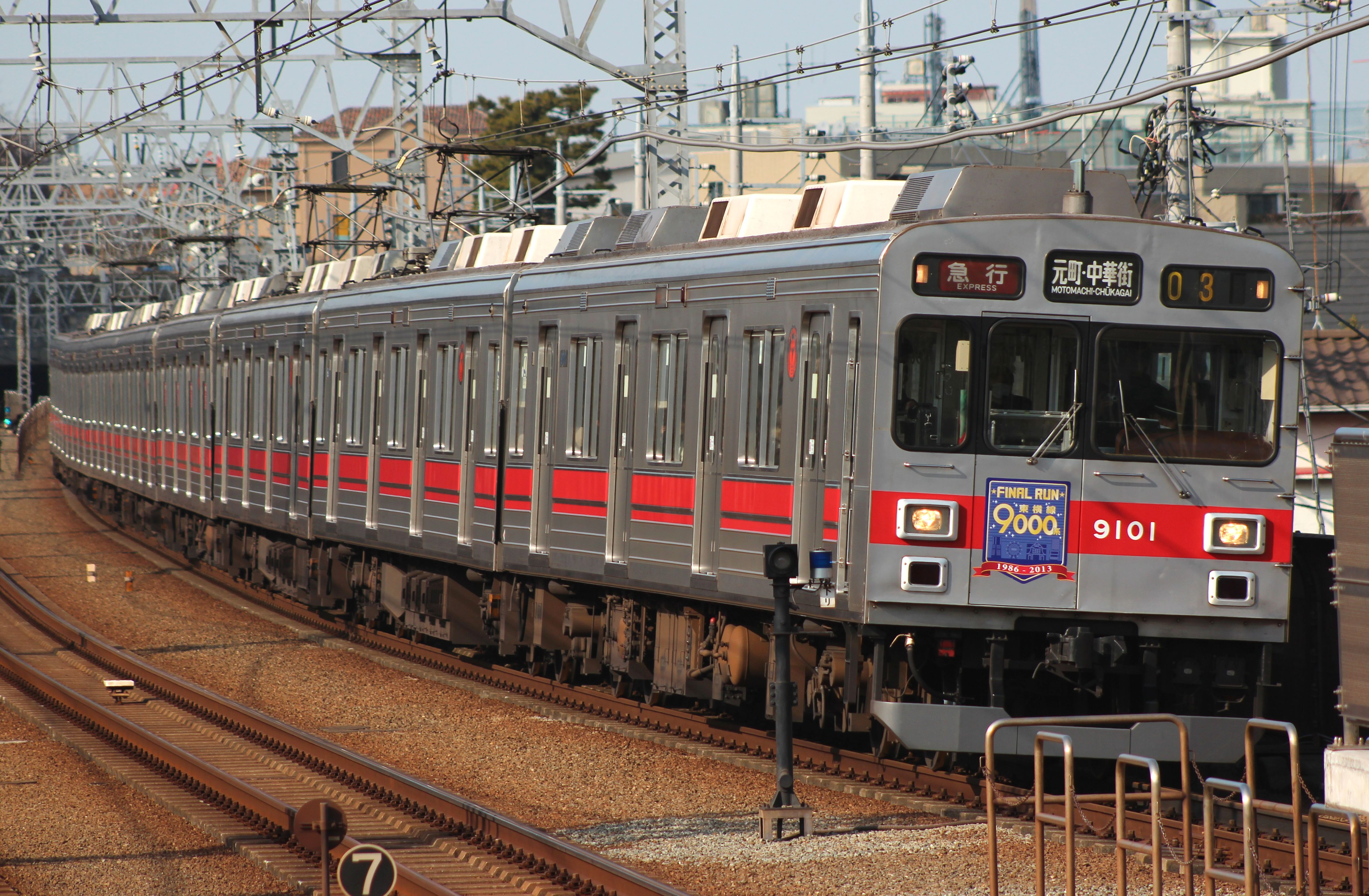
8-car set 9001 with a headmark commemorating its final run on the Toyoko Line, February 2013

=== Future replacement and transfer to Seibu Railway ===
In May 2024, Tokyu Railway announced that as part of its fiscal year 2024 capital investment plan, the 9000 series, together with the Tokyu 9020 series, would be scheduled to be replaced with a new fleet of rolling stock based on the Tokyu 6020 series.

On 26 September 2023, it was announced that Tokyu Railway would be transferring over a number of 9000 series sets to the Seibu Railway, together with some Odakyu 8000 series sets from Odakyu Railway. The 9000 series is expected to enter service with Seibu from Fiscal Year 2025 onwards, and the transfer is expected to be completed by Fiscal Year 2029. Seibu announced that these sets will be used on branch lines such as the Tamako line, Tamagawa line, Chichibu line and the Sayama line.

According to Seibu's official YouTube channel, the transferred Tokyu 9000 series will be renamed the Seibu 7000 series.

== Special liveries ==
A 9000 series set received a special livery to commemorate the 100th anniversary of Tokyu Corporation's founding. The set entered service with the commemorative livery on 29 April 2022.
