= Tokyu 2000 series =

Japanese train type

Tokyu 2000/9020 series
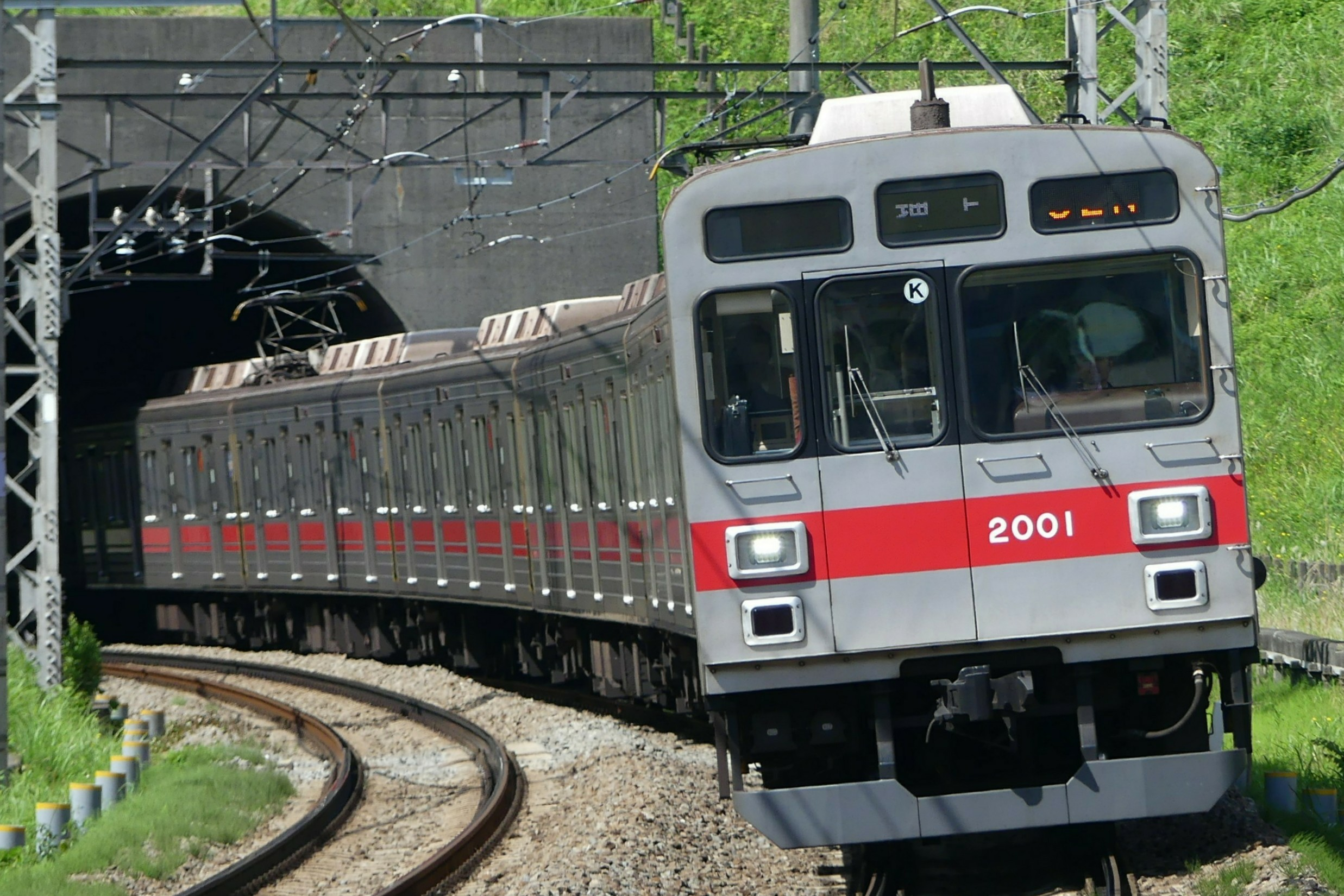
- A 2000 series set on the Den-en-toshi Line
- In service: 1992–2018 (as 2000 series); 2019–present (as 9020 series)
- Manufacturer: Tokyu Car Corporation
- Constructed: 1992–1993
- Entered service: 29 March 1992
- Refurbished: 2018–2019
- Number built: 30 vehicles (3 sets)
- Number in service: 15 vehicles (3 sets)
- Number scrapped: 15 vehicles
- Formation: 5 (formerly 10) cars per trainset
- Fleet numbers: 9021–9023
- Operator: Tokyu Corporation
- Depot: Nagatsuta
- Lines served: Tokyu Oimachi Line; Tokyu Den-en-toshi Line (formerly); Tokyo Metro Hanzomon Line (formerly)

Specifications
- Car body construction: Stainless steel
- Car length: 20,000 mm (65 ft 7 in)
- Width: 2,800 mm (9 ft 2 in)
- Doors: 4 pairs per side
- Maximum speed: service: 110 km/h (68 mph); design: 120 km/h (75 mph)
- Traction system: (Before Refurbishment) GTO-VVVF (After Refurbishment) SiC-VVVF
- Acceleration: 3.3 km/(h⋅s) (2.1 mph/s)
- Deceleration: 3.5 km/(h⋅s) (2.2 mph/s) (service); 4.5 km/(h⋅s) (2.8 mph/s) (emergency)
- Electric systems: 1,500 V DC (overhead wire)
- Current collection: Pantograph
- Safety system: CS-ATC
- Track gauge: 1,067 mm (3 ft 6 in)

The Tokyu 2000 series (東急2000系, Tōkyū 2000-kei), reclassified Tokyu 9020 series (東急9020系, Tōkyū 9020-kei) from 2019, is a Japanese commuter electric multiple unit (EMU) train type operated by Tokyu Corporation in the Tokyo area since 1992. They were used on Tokyu Den-en-toshi Line and Tokyo Metro Hanzomon Line inter-running services from 1992 until 2018, as well as the Tokyu Oimachi Line since 2018. Three 10-car sets were built by Tokyu Car Corporation between 1992 and 1993, all of which were shortened to 5-car sets by March 2019.

== Operations ==
These sets are used on the Tokyu Oimachi Line. Originally, they were used on Tokyu Den-en-toshi Line and Tokyo Metro Hanzomon Line inter-running services; they were not capable of running through onto the Tobu Skytree Line, and had circular "K" stickers on the centre front cab window to indicate this.

== Design ==
Based on the earlier Tokyu 9000 series EMU design, two sets were introduced in 1992, followed by a third in 1993. The first two sets were delivered with roller blind destination indicators, whereas the third set was delivered from new with 3-colour LED destination indicators. All three sets have since been modified with full-colour LED destination indicators.

== Formations ==
=== Den-en-toshi Line 10-car sets ===
The 10-car sets consisted of six motored (M) cars and four unpowered trailer (T) cars, formed as shown below, with car 1 at the Shibuya end.

Car No.	1	2	3	4	5	6	7	8	9	10
Designation	Tc2	M2	M1	T2	M2	M1	T1	M2	M1	Tc1
Numbering	2000	2250	2200	2700	2350	2300	2800	2450	2400	2100
Weight (t)	27.8	33.1	34.7	26.2	33.1	34.7	27.2	33.1	34.7	27.8
Capacity (total)	130	144	144	144	144	144	144	144	144	130

Cars 3, 6, and 9 were each fitted with one lozenge type pantograph. (Note: Two single-arm pantographs for refurbished set 2103) Cars 3 and 9 had wheelchair spaces.

=== Oimachi Line 5-car sets ===
The 5-car sets consist of three motored cars and two trailer cars, formed as shown below, with car 1 at the Oimachi end.

Car No.	1	2	3	4	5
Designation	Tc2	M	M2	M1	Tc1
Numbering	9020	9220	9320	9420	9120

Car 4 is fitted with two single-arm pantographs, and car 2 is fitted with one.

== Interior ==
Passenger accommodation consists of longitudinal bench seating throughout.

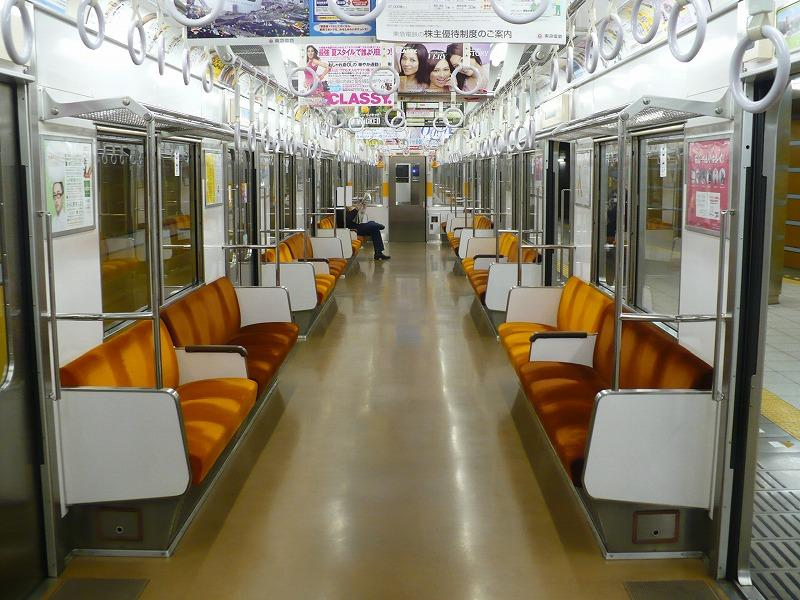
Interior view

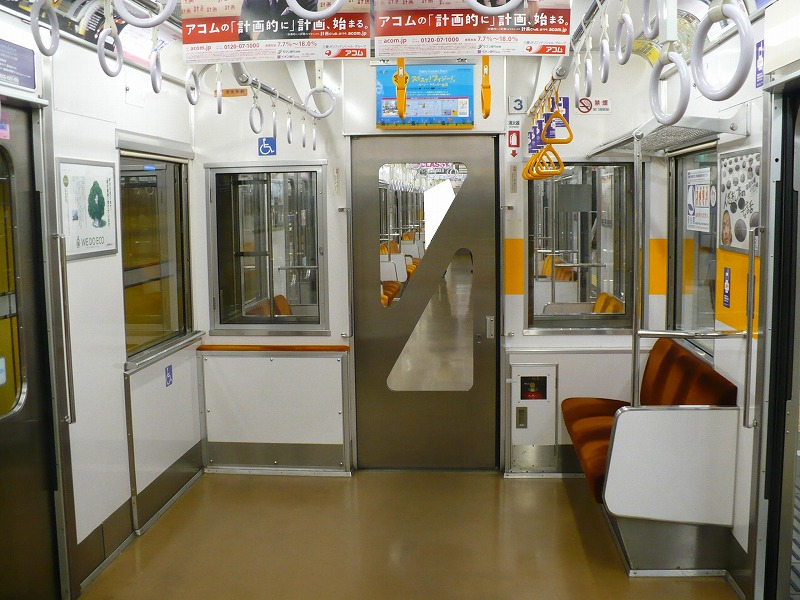
Interior view of car 3, showing the wheelchair space

== History ==
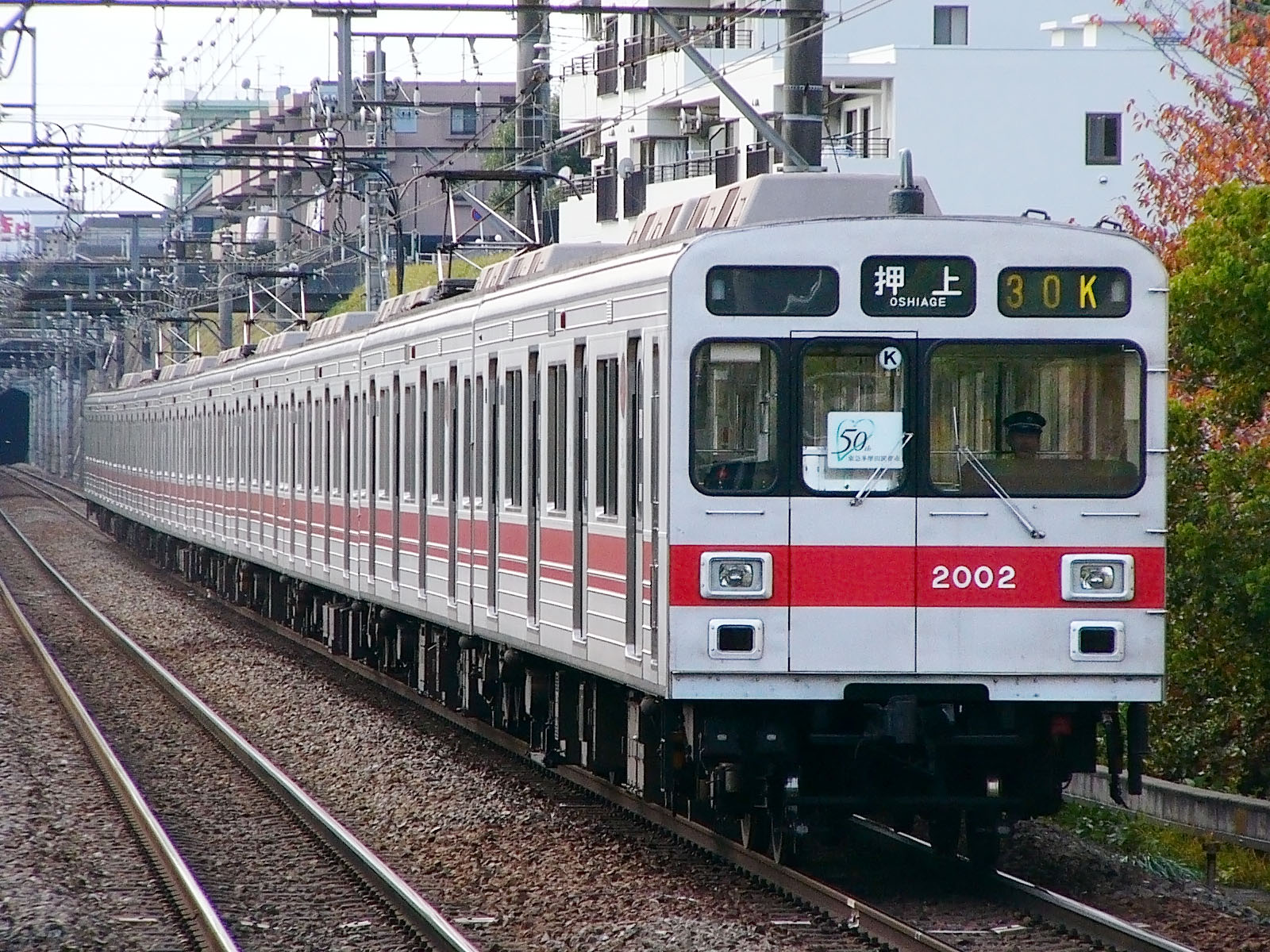
Set 2102 on the Den-en-toshi Line, with original roller blind destination indicators and no front end skirt, November 2004

The first two sets entered service on the Den-en-toshi Line in September 1992, with a third following in 1993.

=== Refurbishment, Oimachi Line transfer, and reclassification to 9020 series ===
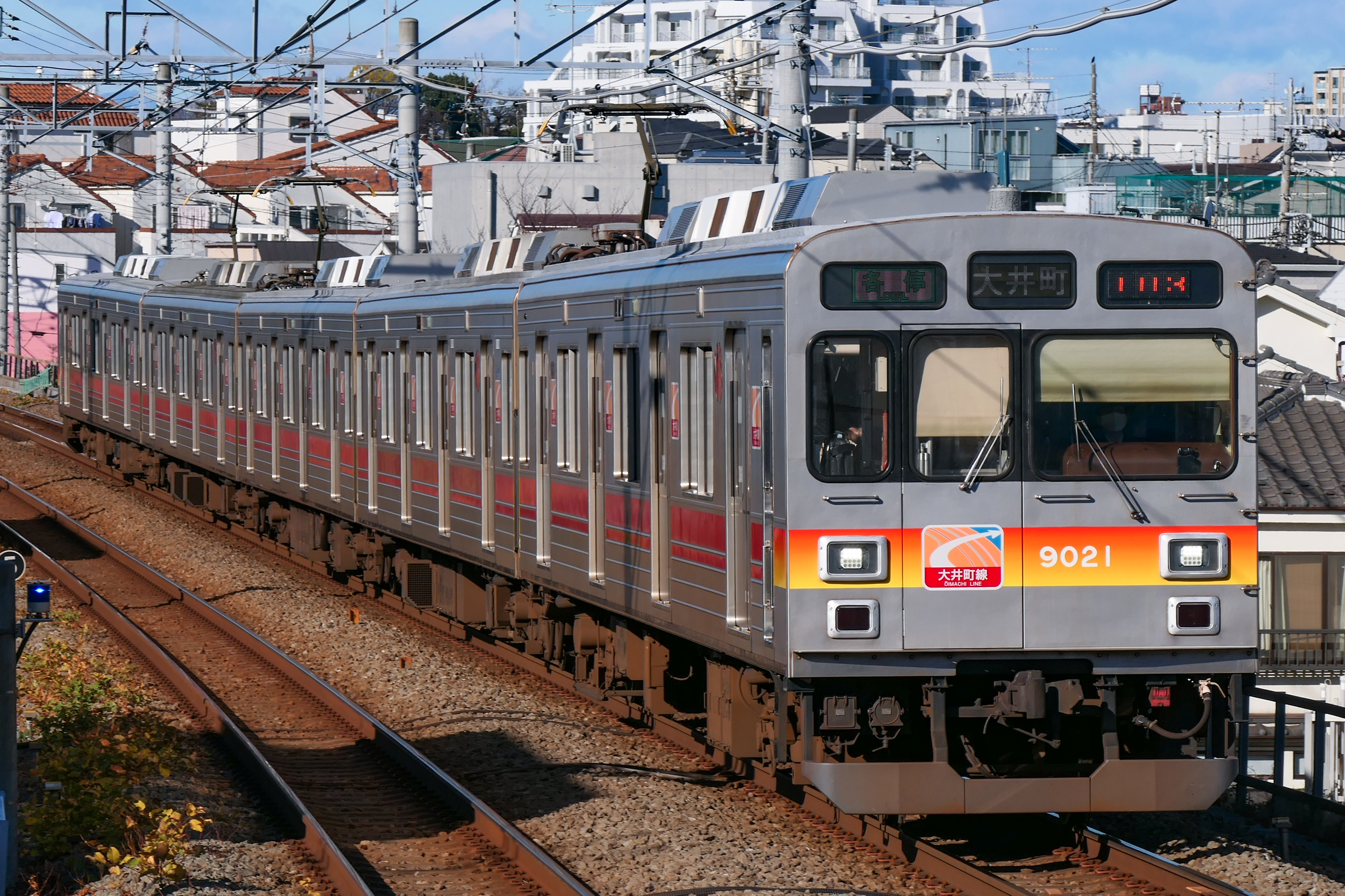
9020 series set 9021 (formerly 2101) on the Oimachi Line, December 2021

In March 2018, set 2103 (excluding its T2 and T1 cars) underwent a programme of refurbishment. The refurbishment included the implementation of a new traction system as well as an updated interior with new seating moquette and additional wheelchair spaces. In addition, the original lozenge pantographs were replaced with single-arm pantographs.

Later that year, the 2000 series fleet was withdrawn from Den-en-toshi Line services and shortened to 5-car sets for use on the Oimachi Line beginning with set 2103. By February 2019, 2000 series set 2102 had also been transferred; both sets were reclassified "9020 series" and respectively numbered 9022 and 9023. Set 2101 was transferred to the Oimachi Line in March 2019; it was subsequently renumbered 9021.

The fifteen cars deemed surplus as a result of the fleet's transfer were scrapped in 2018.

=== Future replacement ===
In October 2023, Seibu Railway announced that they would convert the 9020 series, together with the 9000 series, into Seibu 7000 series trainsets in order to replace the Seibu 2000 series trainsets. In May 2024, Tokyu Railway announced that as part of its 2024 capital investment plan, both train types are scheduled to be replaced with a new fleet of rolling stock based on the 6020 series.
