= Mechanical Engineering Heritage (Japan) =

JSME Heritage items

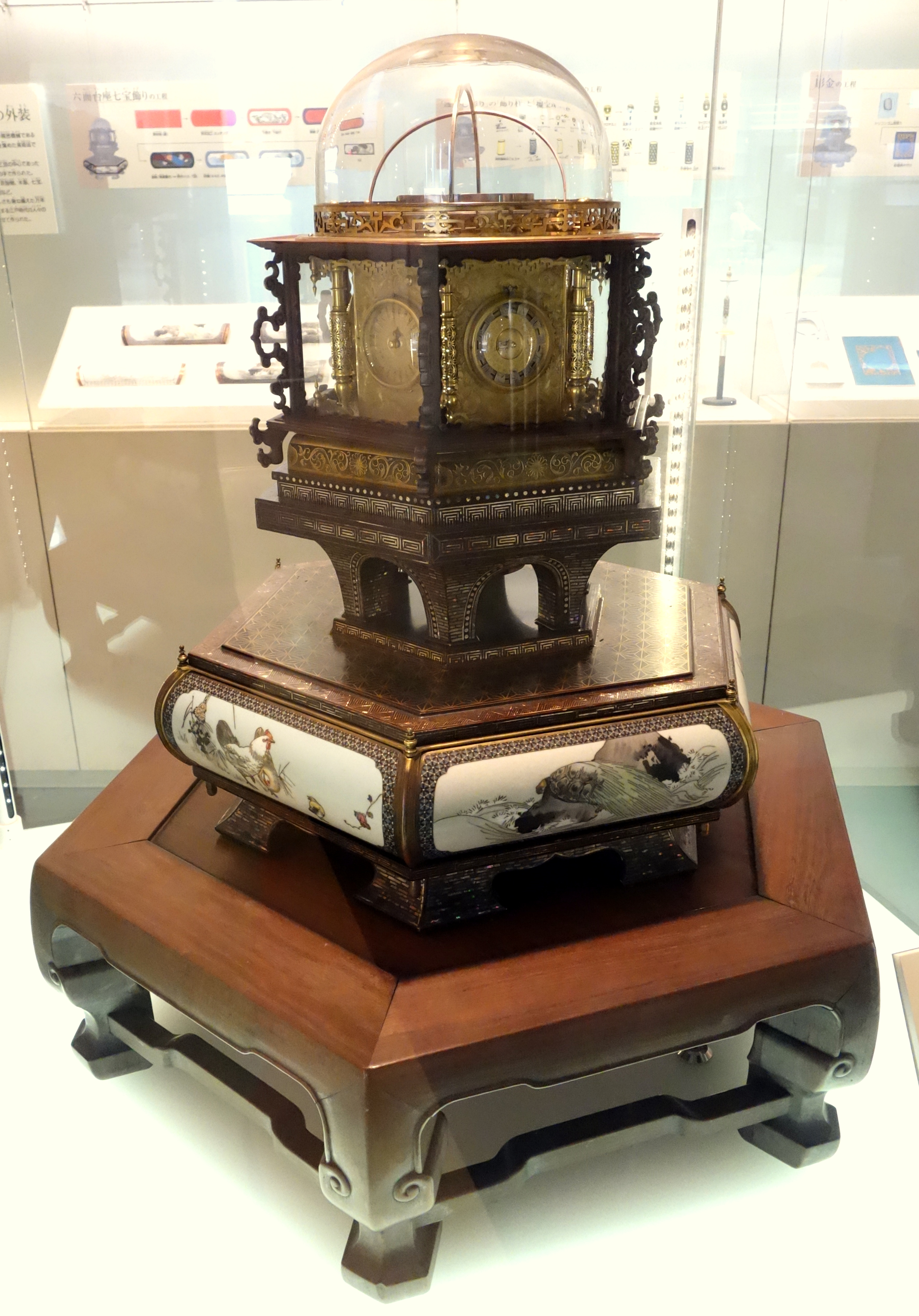
Heritage No. 22 – Myriad year clock

The Mechanical Engineering Heritage (Japan) (機械遺産, kikaiisan) is a list of sites, landmarks, machines, and documents that made significant contributions to the development of mechanical engineering in Japan. Items in the list are certified by the Japan Society of Mechanical Engineers (JSME) (日本機械学会, Nihon Kikai Gakkai).

== Overview ==
The Mechanical Engineering Heritage program was inaugurated in June 2007 in connection with the 110th anniversary of the founding of the JSME. The program recognizes machines and their related systems, factories, specification documents, textbooks, and other items that had a significant impact on the development of mechanical engineering in Japan. When a certified item can no longer be maintained by its current owner, the JSME acts to prevent its loss by arranging a transfer to the National Science Museum of Japan or to a local government institution.

== Categories ==
Items in the Mechanical Engineering Heritage (Japan) are classified into four categories:

- Sites: Historical sites that contain heritage items.
- Landmarks: Representative buildings, structures, and machinery.
- Collections: Collections of machinery, or individual machines.
- Documents: Machinery-related documents of historical significance.

Each item is assigned a Mechanical Engineering Heritage number. No. 100 is a dual entry, composed of both a collection and documents.

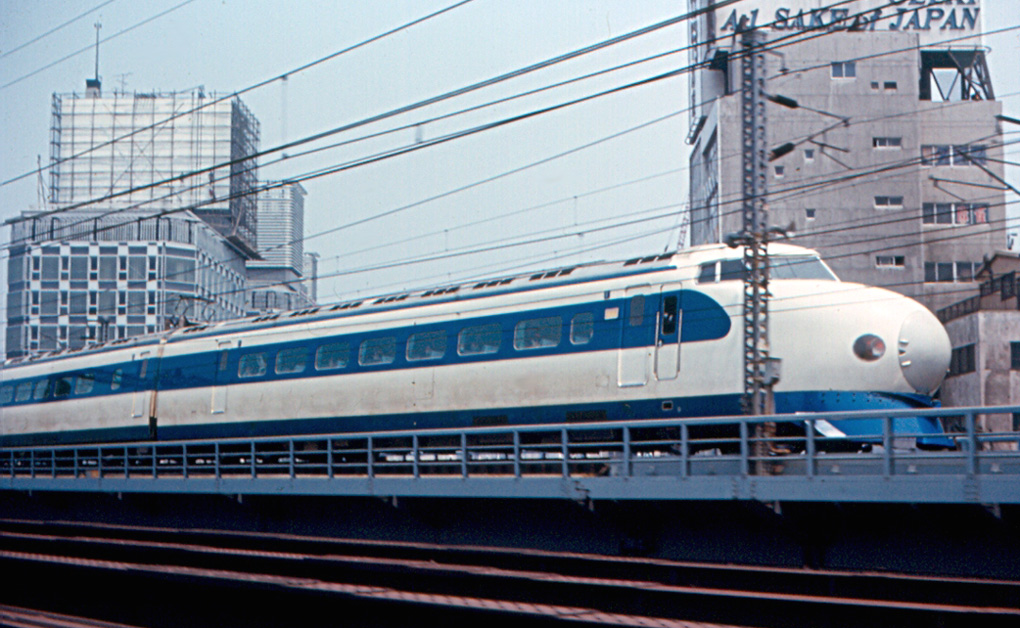
Heritage No. 11 – A 0 series railcar in Tokyo in May 1967

== Items certified in 2007 ==
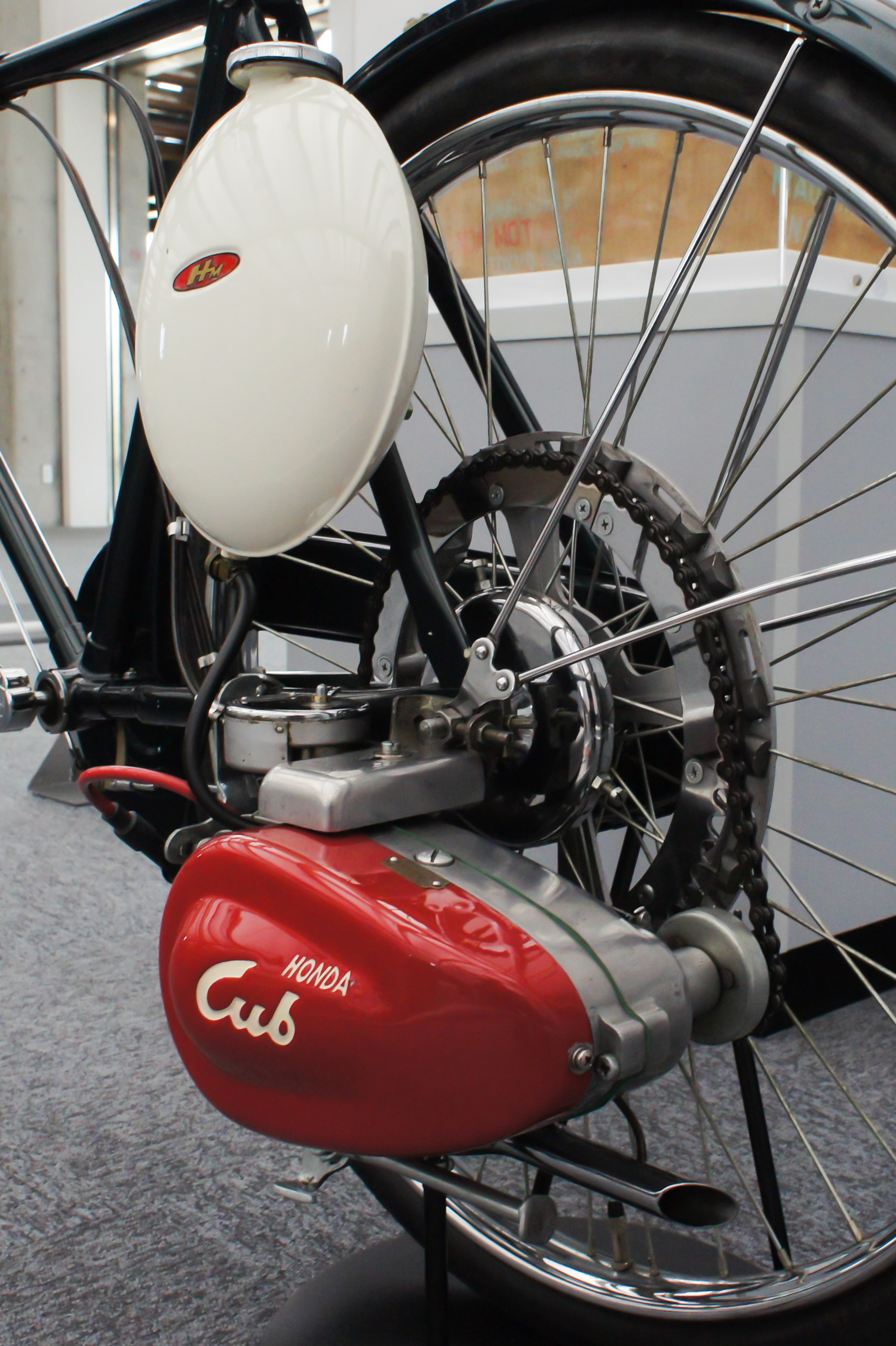
Heritage No. 14 – Honda Cub F rear-side Honda Collection Hall

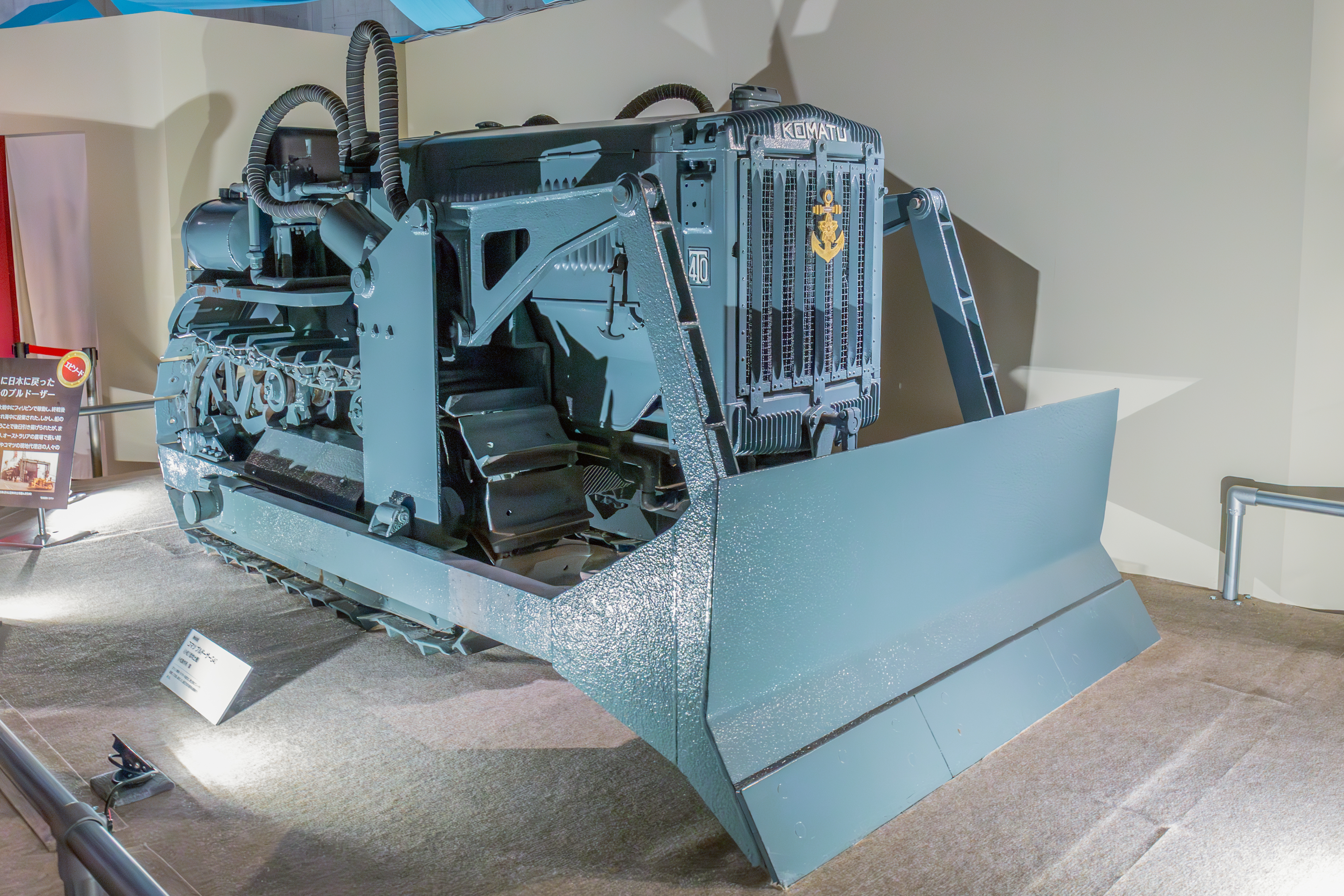
Heritage No. 18 – Komatsu G40 bulldozer

No.	Year created	Type	Description	Location	Notes
001	1868	Site	Steam engines and hauling machinery at the Kosuge Ship Repair Dock	Nagasaki Prefecture	
002	1908	Landmark	Memorial workshop and machine tools at Kumamoto University	Kumamoto Prefecture	
003	1875	Collection	Forged iron treadle lathe	Aichi Prefecture	Made by Kaheiji Ito
004	1908	Collection	Industrial Steam Turbine	Nagasaki Prefecture	Parsons steam turbine
005	1967	Collection	10A Mazda Wankel engine	Hiroshima Prefecture	
006		Collection	Honda CVCC engine	Tochigi Prefecture	First engine to meet the emission standards of Clean Air Act (1970)
007	1971	Collection	FJR710 Jet Engine	Tokyo	
008	1933	Collection	Yanmar small horizontal Diesel Engine, Model HB	Shiga Prefecture	
009	1912	Collection	Professor Inokuchi Ariya's centrifugal pump	Aichi Prefecture	
010	1929	Collection	High frequency generator (radio)	Aichi Prefecture	Made by German AEG
011	1963	Collection	0-Series Tōkaidō Shinkansen electric multiple units	Osaka Prefecture	Operated 1964–1978
012	1902–1909	Collection	Class 230 No. 233 2-4-2 steam tank locomotive	Osaka Prefecture	
013	1962-1974	Collection	YS11 passenger airplane	Tokyo	Flown 1964–2009
014	1952	Collection	Honda Cub F bicycle engine	Tochigi Prefecture	
015	1928	Collection	Chain stitch sewing machine for the production of straw hats	Aichi Prefecture	
016	1924	Collection	Non-stop shuttle change automatic loom, Toyoda (Toyota) Type G	Aichi Prefecture	
017	1885	Collection	Hand operated letterpress printing machine	Tokyo	
018	1943	Collection	Komatsu G40 bulldozer	Shizuoka Prefecture	
019	1950	Collection	Olympus gastrocamera GT-I	Tokyo	
020		Collection	Buckton universal testing machine	Hyōgo Prefecture	Installed in 1908
021	1953	Collection	Mutoh manual drafting machine MH-I	Tokyo	
022	1851	Collection	Myriad year clock	Tokyo	
023	1935	Collection	The Chikugo River Lift Bridge	Between Fukuoka and Saga Prefecture	Closed in 1987, reopened for pedestrians in 1996
024	1897, 1901, and 1934, published	Document	JSME publications from the early days of the society	Tokyo	
025	1905	Document	Hydraulics and hydraulic machinery, lecture notes by Professors Bunji Mano and Ariya Inokuchi at Imperial University of Tokyo	Tokyo	

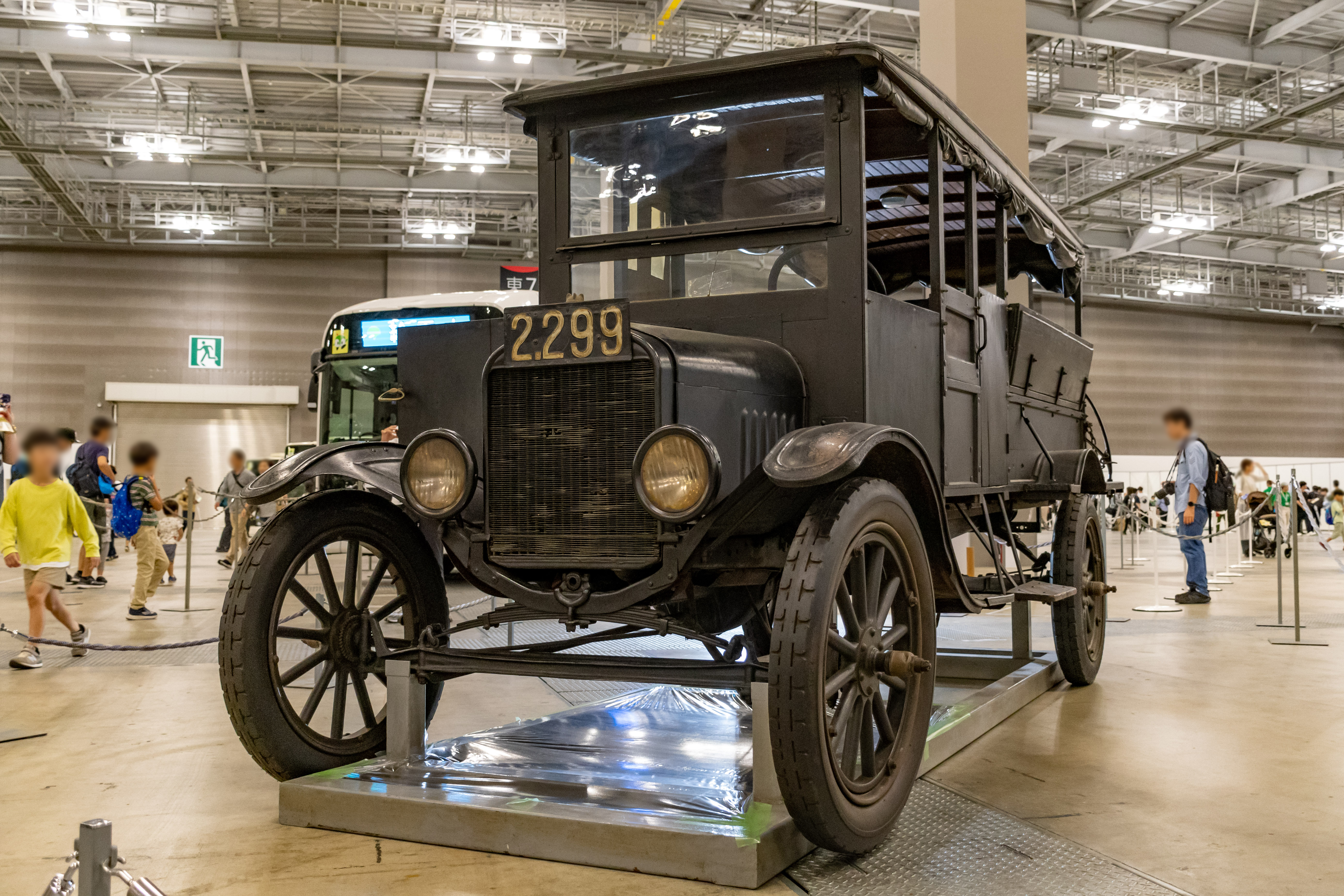
Heritage No. 28 – Entaro Bus at Bus Festival 2024 hosted by the Bureau of Transportation, Tokyo Metropolitan Government

== Items certified in 2008 ==
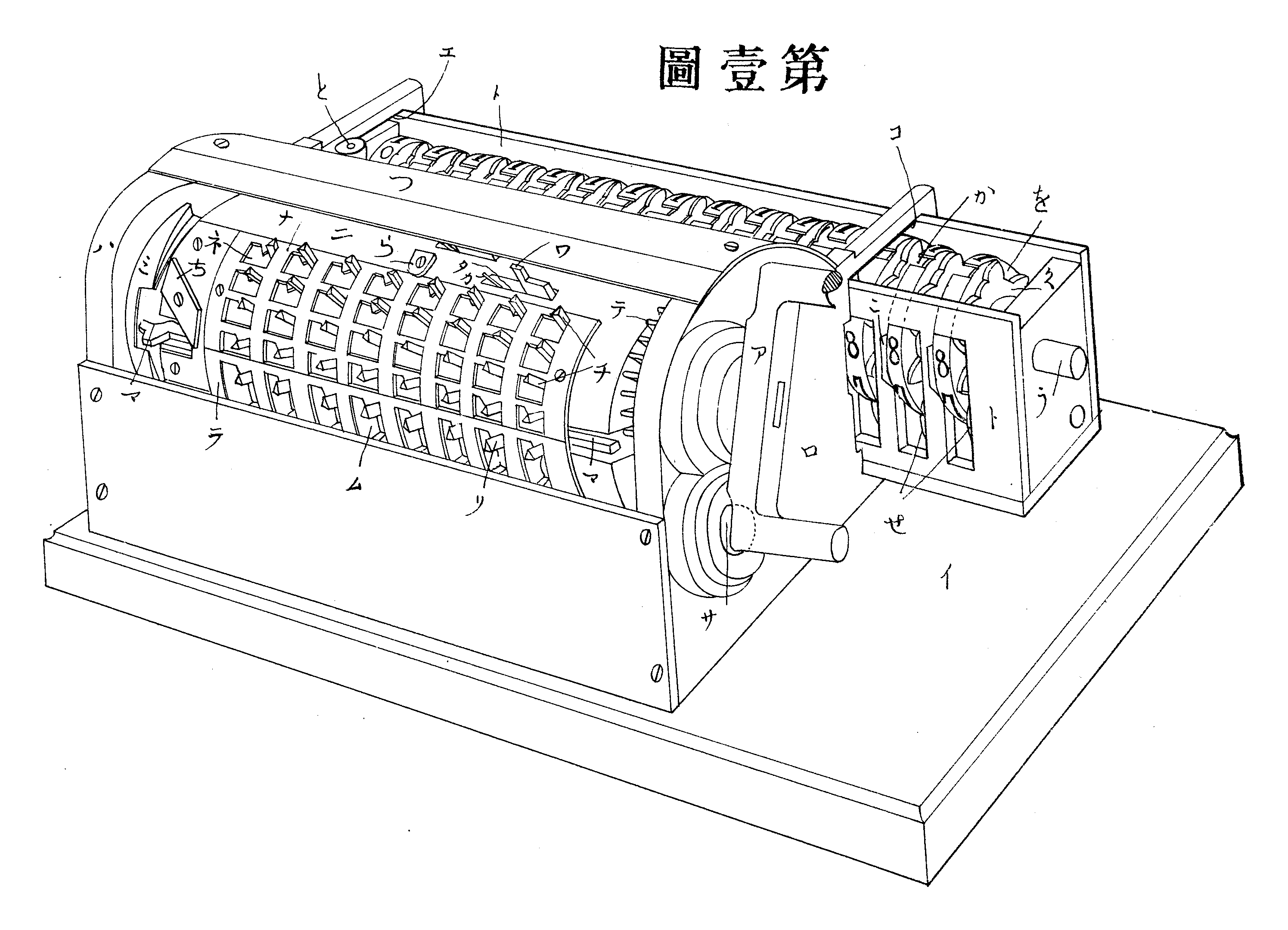
Yazu Arithmometer, Heritage No. 30

No.	Year created	Type	Description	Location	Notes
026	1888	Site	Sankyozawa Power Station and related objects	Miyagi Prefecture	Operating since 1888
027	1908, 1905	Site	Hydraulic lock (Note: made in United Kingdom, operating since 1908) and floating steam crane (Note: operated 1905–2008) in Miike Port	Fukuoka Prefecture	
028	1923	Collection	Omnibus "Entaro" (Ford TT type)	Saitama Prefecture	Adapted from the chassis of a Ford Model TT that was imported from the United States
029	1947	Collection	Mechanical telecommunication devices	Iwate Prefecture	Made by Shinko Seisakusho Co.
030	1903, patented	Collection	Yazu Arithmometer (Mechanical calculator)	Fukuoka Prefecture	Invented by Ryōichi Yazu
031	1910	Collection	Induction motor and design sheet	Ibaraki Prefecture	

== Items certified in 2009 ==
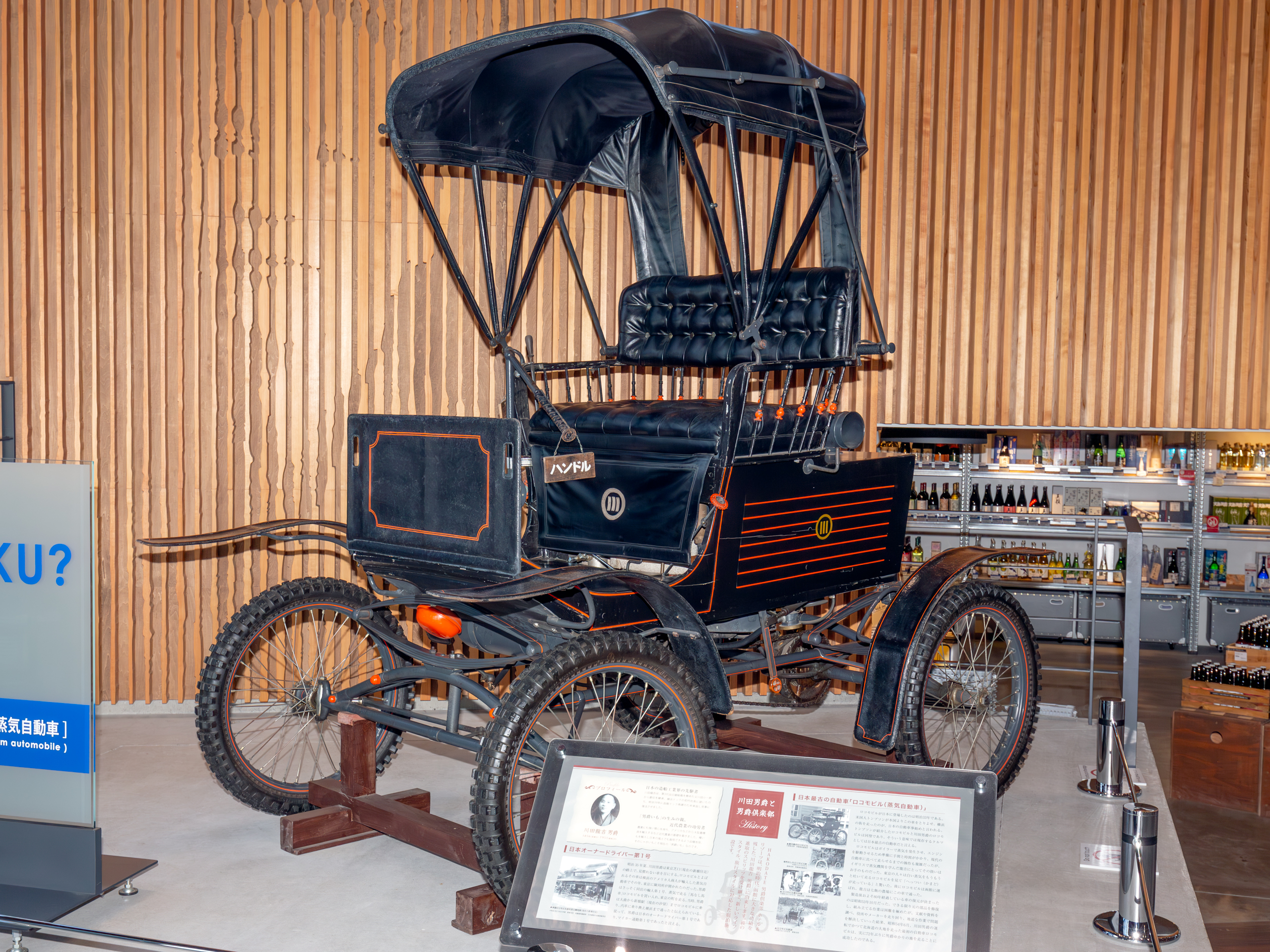
Heritage No.35 – Locomobile owned by Baron Ryokichi Kawada, on display at Danshaku Lounge

No.	Year created	Type	Description	Location	Notes
032	1881	Site	Mechanical device of Sapporo Clock Tower	Hokkaidō	Clock mechanism imported/installed from E. Howard & Co., moved in 1906
033	1808	Landmark	Minegishi watermill	Tokyo	Water Mill Farmhouse at Nogawa River, Musashino area, in operation until 1968
034	1943	Collection	The Master Worm wheel of the Hobbing machine HRS-500	Shizuoka Prefecture	Machining by the Hobbing machine of Rhein-Neckar from Germany
035		Collection	Locomobile	Hokkaidō	The oldest private steam automobile in Japan, one of eight imported from Locomobile Company of America in 1902, failured in 1908, discovered in 1978 needing only a boiler replacement and remained operable until 1980
036	1916	Collection	Arrow-Gou	Fukuoka Prefecture	The oldest Japanese-made car created by Koichi Yano
037	1897	Collection	British-made 50 ft Turntable	Shizuoka Prefecture	Imported from Ransomes & Rapier and installed in an unknown location. Moved in 1941, then moved again to Ōigawa Railway in 1980, still in operation

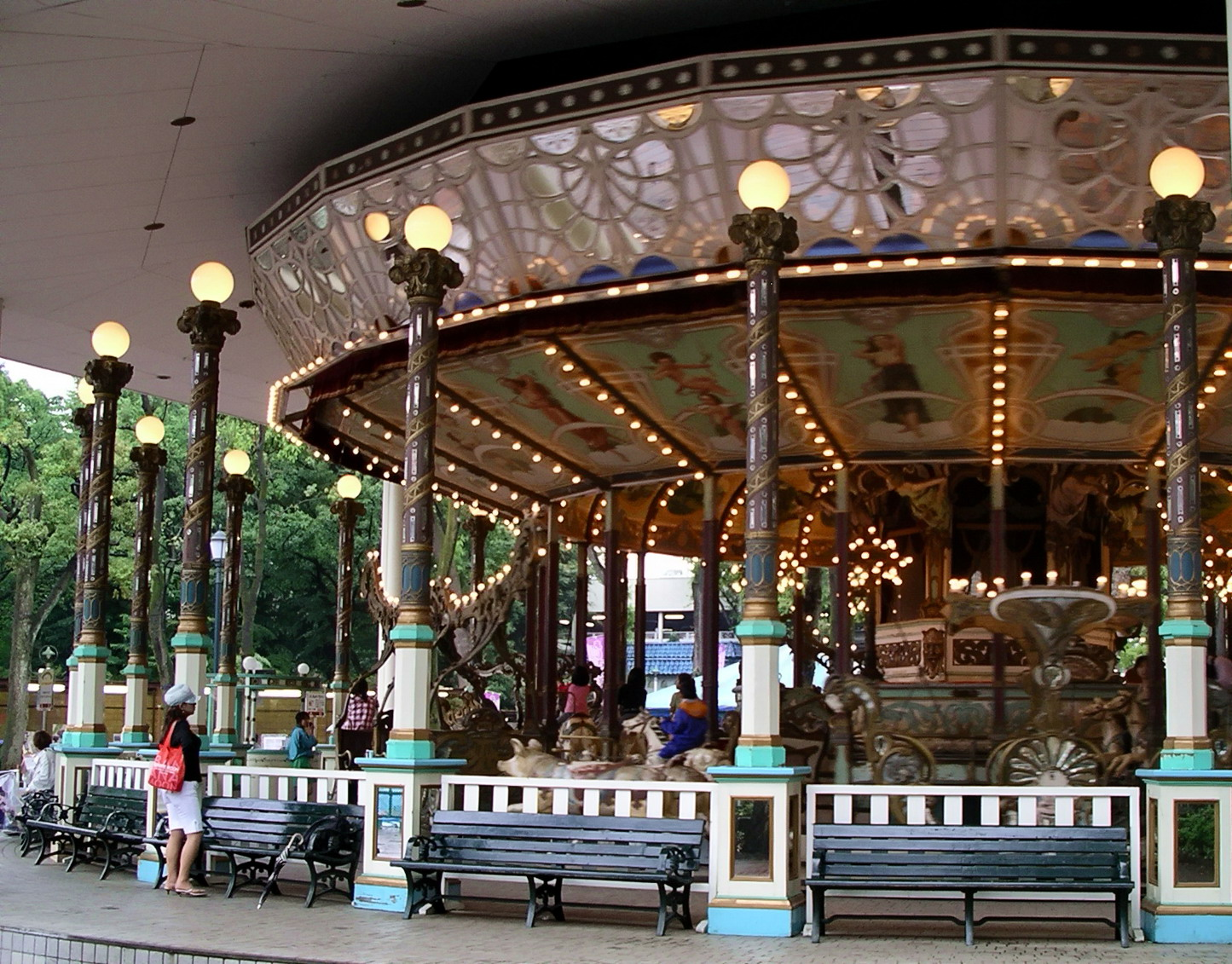
Heritage No. 38 – Carousel El Dorado in Toshimaen

== Items certified in 2010 ==
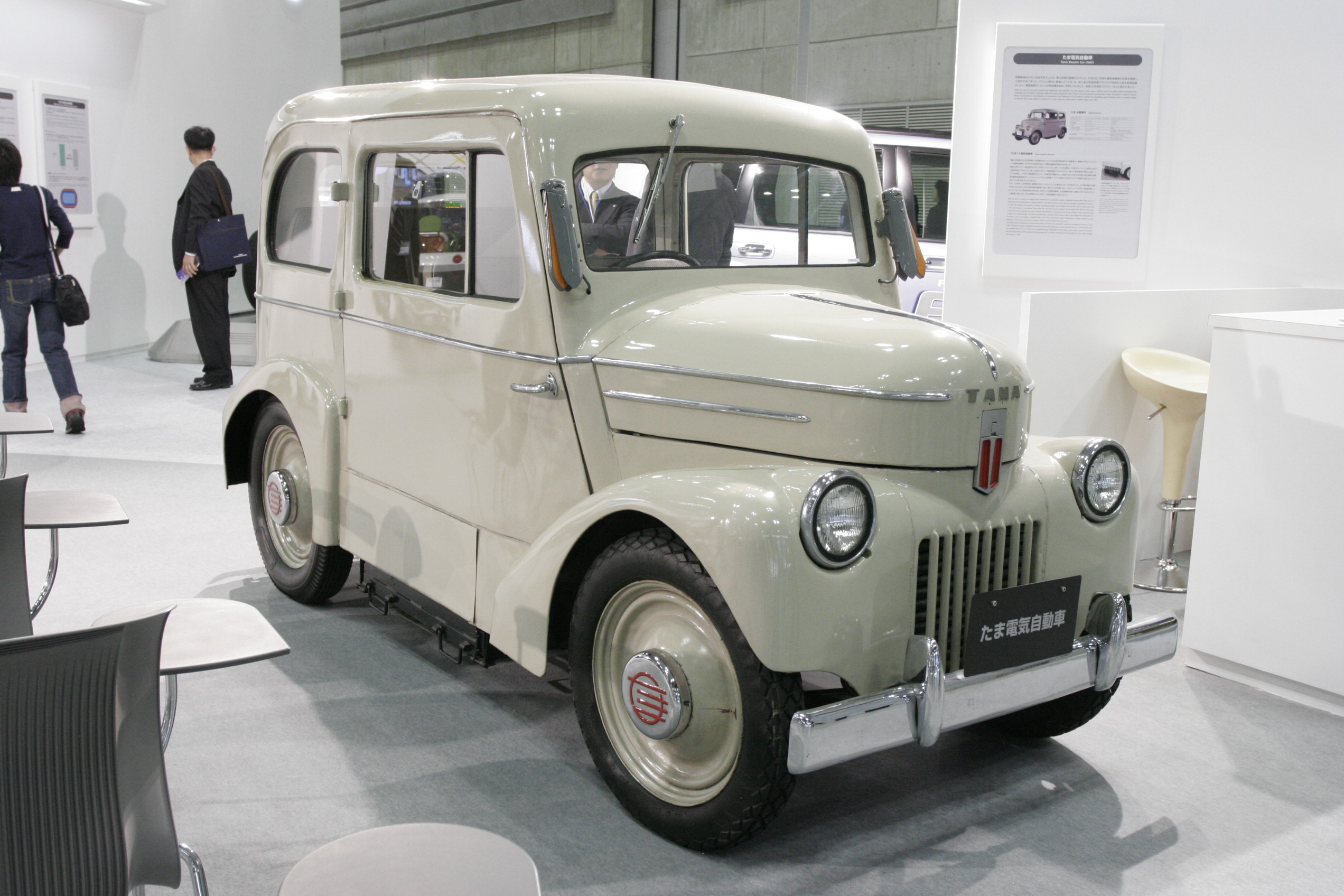
Heritage No. 40. – Electric vehicle TAMA

No.	Year created	Type	Description	Location	Notes
038	1907	Landmark	Carousel El Dorado of Toshimaen	Tokyo	Produced by Hugo Haase, refurbished and operated in Toshimaen from 1971 to 2020
039	1835	Landmark	Revolving stage and its slewing mechanism of Konpira Grand Theatre	Kagawa Prefecture	
040	1947	Collection	Electric vehicle TAMA (E4S-47 I)	Kanagawa Prefecture	Produced by Tachikawa Aircraft Company Ltd because of the oil shortage after World War II. The car has a single 36V, 120A motor and can travel 65 km with a single charge, has a maximum speed of 35 km/h
041	1949	Collection	The first Japanese forklift truck with internal combustion engine	Shiga Prefecture	Has a maximum load of 6,000 pounds (2,700 kg). Modeled after Clark Material Handling Company's 4,000 pounds (1,800 kg) model.
042	1931, installed	Collection	Takasago and Ebara type centrifugal refrigerating machine	Kanagawa Prefecture	
043	1967	Collection	Automated Ticket Gate (Turnstile)	Kyoto Prefecture	Model 3S2PG operated until 2009, by OMRON and Kintetsu Railway

== Items certified in 2011 ==
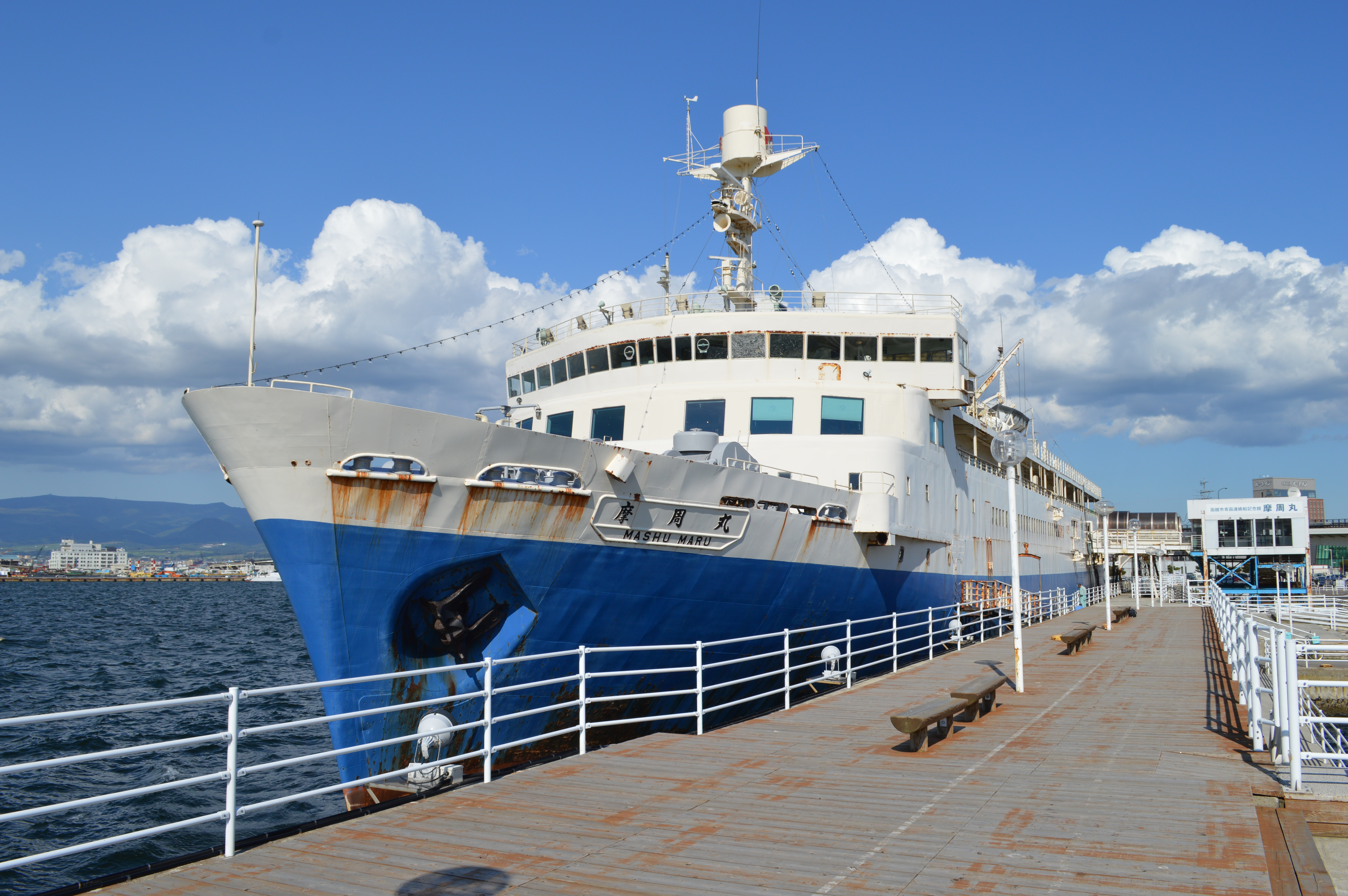
Heritage No. 44. – Mashū-Maru

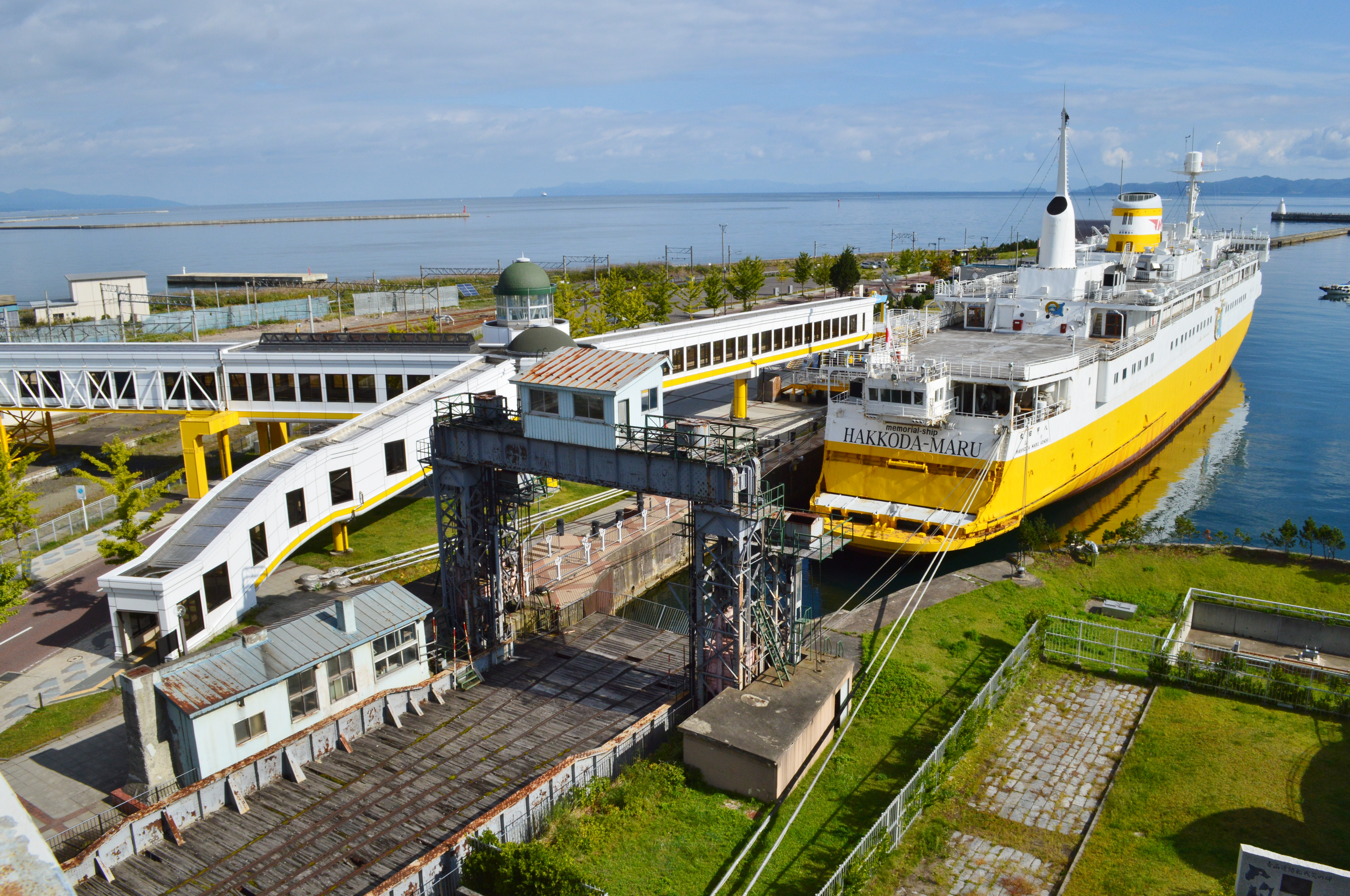
Heritage No. 44 – Hakkoda-Maru

No.	Year created	Type	Description	Location	Notes
044	1908	Landmark	Seikan Train Ferry and Moving Rail Bridge	Hokkaidō and Aomori Prefecture	Landmark is both Hakkoda-Maru (八甲田丸) and the moving rail bridge at Aomori Station, and Mashū-Maru and the moving rail bridge at Hakodate Station
045	1924	Collection	Type ED15 Electric Locomotive	Ibaraki Prefecture	In operation until 1960
046	1872	Collection	Silk reeling machines of the Okaya Silk Museum (岡谷蚕糸博物館)	Nagano Prefecture	Machines are: 2 silk reeling machines imported by French engineer Paul Brunat (ポール・ブリューナ) for Tomioka silk mill and various Japanese-made silk machines
047	1897	Collection	Toyoda Power Loom	Aichi prefecture	Invented by Sakichi Toyoda
048	1965	Collection	Hydraulic excavator UH03	Ibaraki Prefecture	Double hydraulic pumps and double valves, previous excavators had a single pump and valve.
049	1953	Collection	Zipper chain machine (YKK-CM6)	Toyama Prefecture	Modeled after a machine that was imported from the U.S. in 1950.
050	1962	Collection	Takamisawa Electric's Ticket Vending Machine	Nagano prefecture	The first multi-function train ticket vending machine, contained a printing mechanism and was capable of vending multiple types of tickets.

== Items certified in 2012 ==
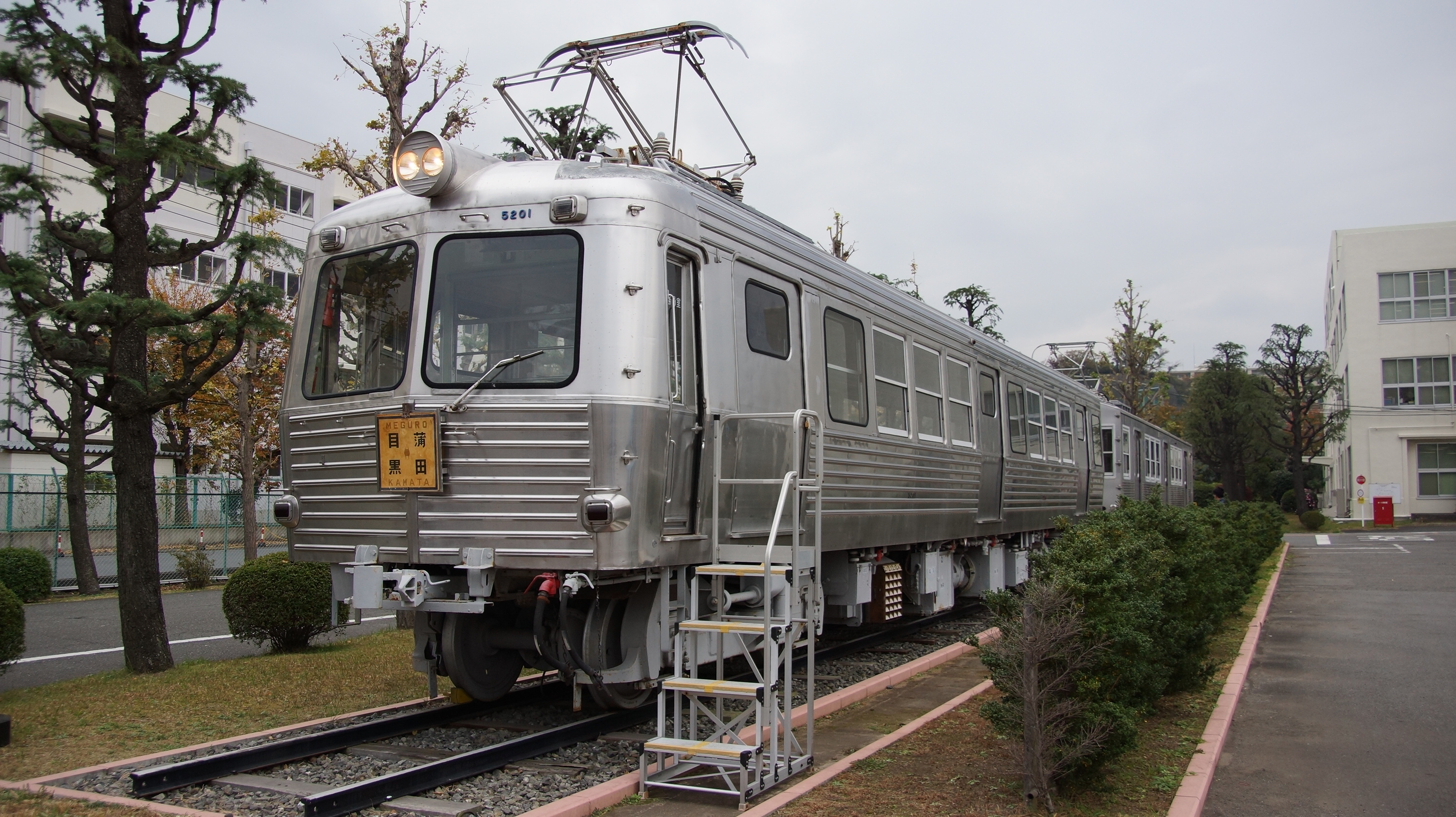
Heritage No. 51 – Tokyu 5200 series EMU car 5201 preserved at the J-TREC factory in Yokohama, Japan

No.	Year created	Type	Description	Location	Notes
051	1958	Landmark	Tokyu 5200 series and Tokyu 7000 series railcars	Kanagawa Prefecture	
052	1929	Landmark	Yoshino Ropeway, an aerial lift line.	Nara Prefecture	Opened on March 12, 1929. Oldest surviving aerial lift line in Japan.
053	1889	Collection	Ikegai Corp. 9 foot (2.7 m) Lathe	Tokyo	
054	1955	Collection	Ricoh desktop copier model Ricopy 101, blueprint reproduction machine.	Shizuoka Prefecture	Uses a diazo chemical process.
055	1980	Collection	Washlet G innovated by Toto Ltd.	Fukuoka Prefecture	The basis of the design was from American Bidet company, imported in 1964.

== Items certified in 2013 ==
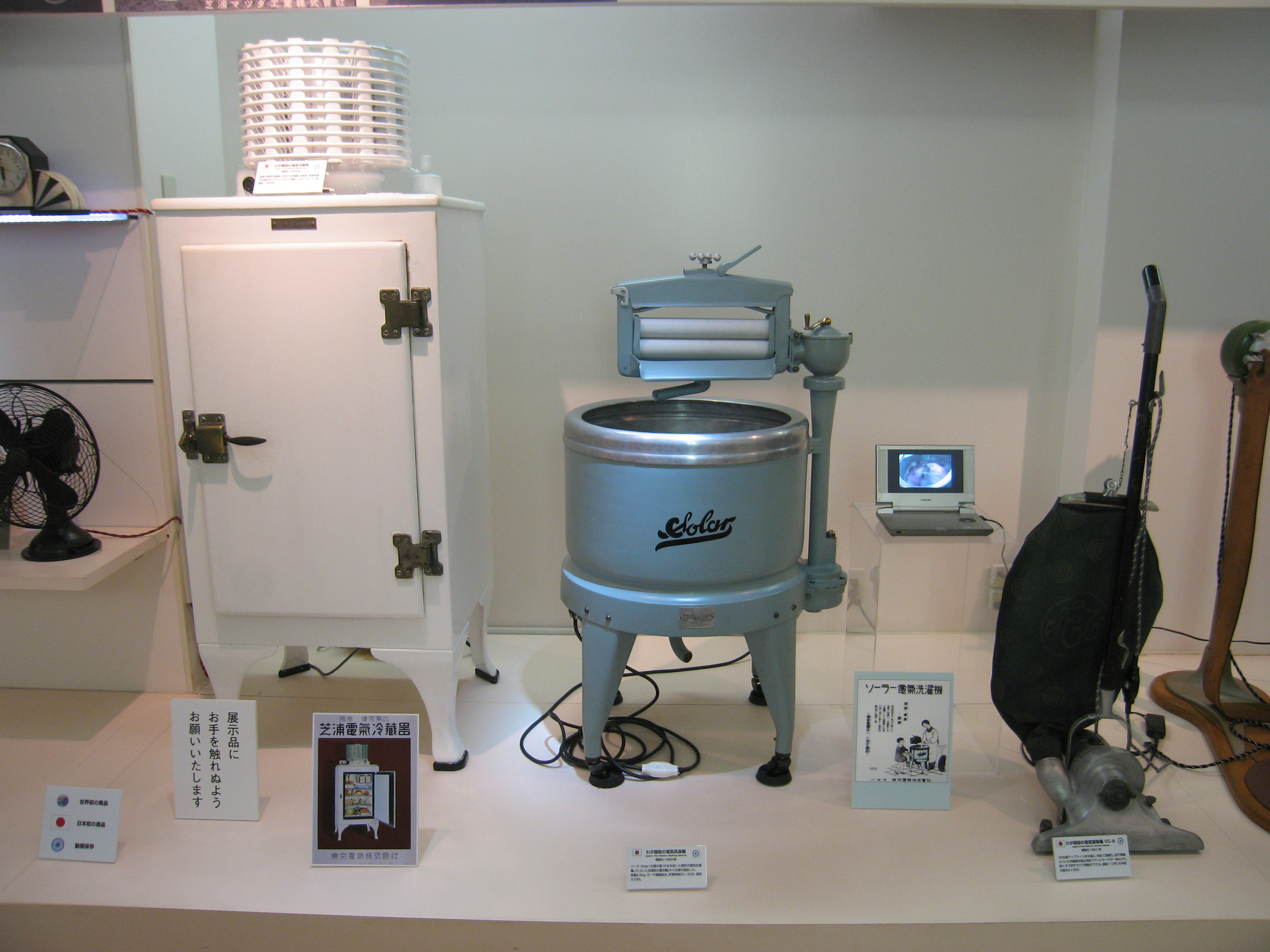
Heritage No. 57 – Left to right: SS-1200, Solar, and VC-A at Toshiba Science Museum, Kawasaki, Japan

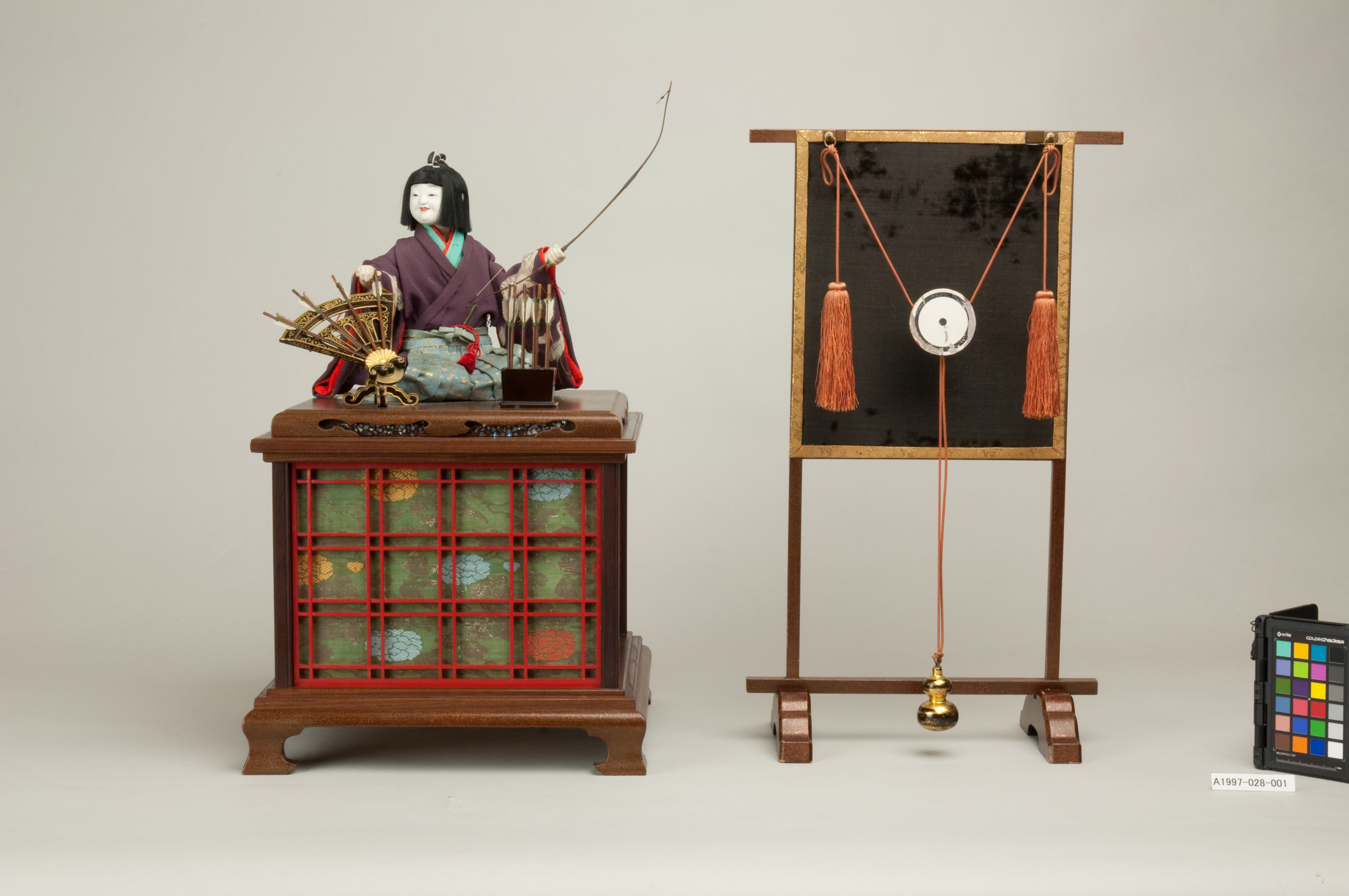
Heritage No. 61 – Karakuri puppet, Yumi-Hiki Doji

No.	Year created	Type	Description	Location	Notes
056	1976, imported	Landmark	Mechanical car parking system ROTOPARK	Tokyo	Made by Bajulaz S.A. company of Switzerland, installed underground at the south exit of Shinjuku Station.
057	1930-1931	Collection	Dawn of Japanese home electric appliances made by Toshiba	Kanagawa Prefecture	Electric Refrigerator Model SS-1200 (1930); Electric Washing Machine Model A/Solar (1930); Electric Vacuum Cleaner Model VC-A (1931)
058	1865, imported	Collection	Yokosuka Naval Arsenal steam hammer	Kanagawa Prefecture	Imported from Netherlands
059	1954	Collection	Okuma Corporation non-round plain bearing and GPB Cylindrical Grinder	Aichi Prefecture	
060	1927	Collection	16mm Film Projector	Aichi Prefecture	Developed by Hidenobu Sakaki, founder of Elmo.
061	19th century	Collection	Japanese Automata Yumihiki-Doji (lit: a boy bending a bow), a karakuri ningyō	Fukuoka Prefecture	Created by Hisashige Tanaka

== Items certified in 2014 ==
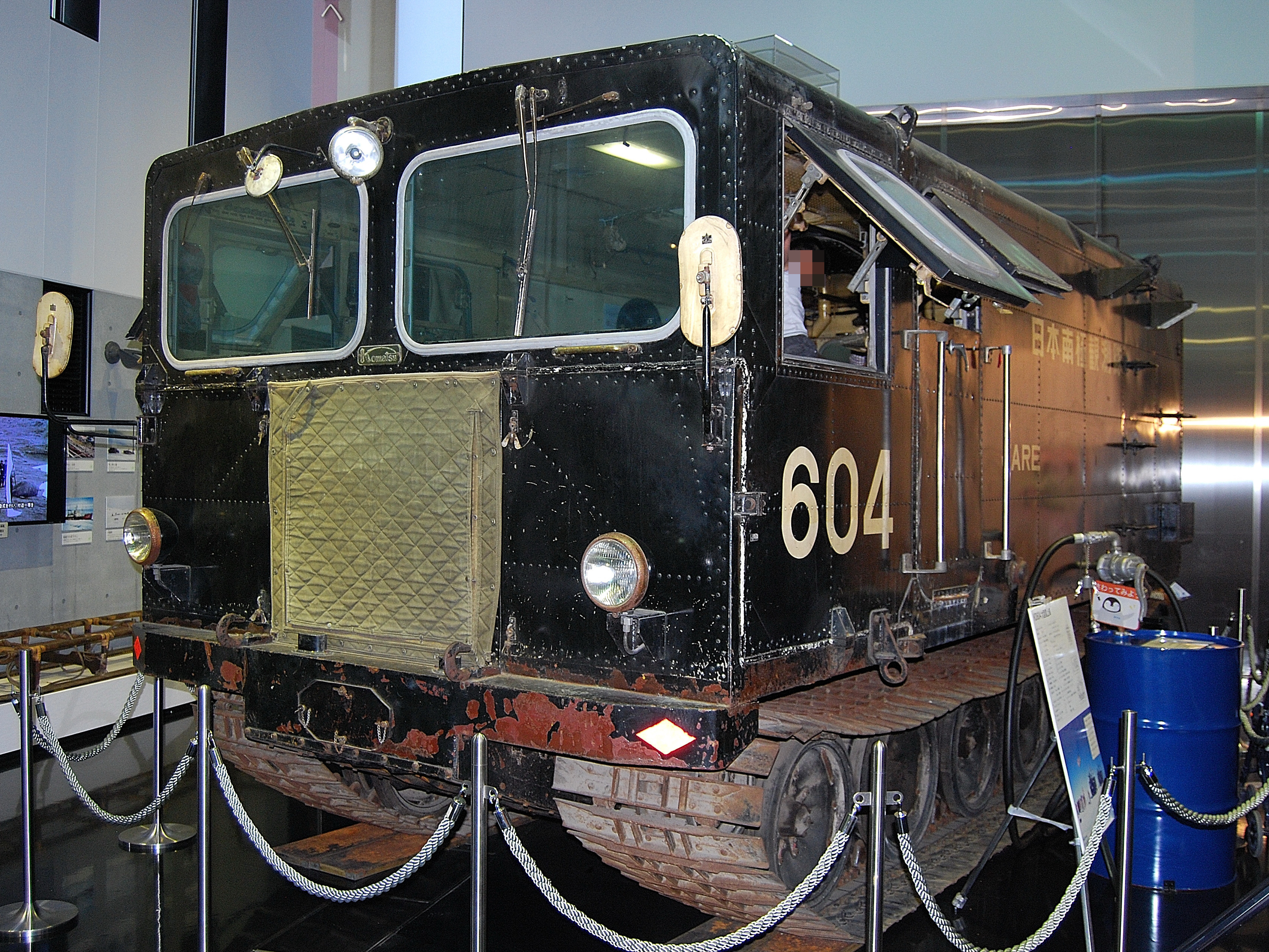
Heritage No. 65 – KD604 snow vehicle on display in Showa Station (Antarctica)

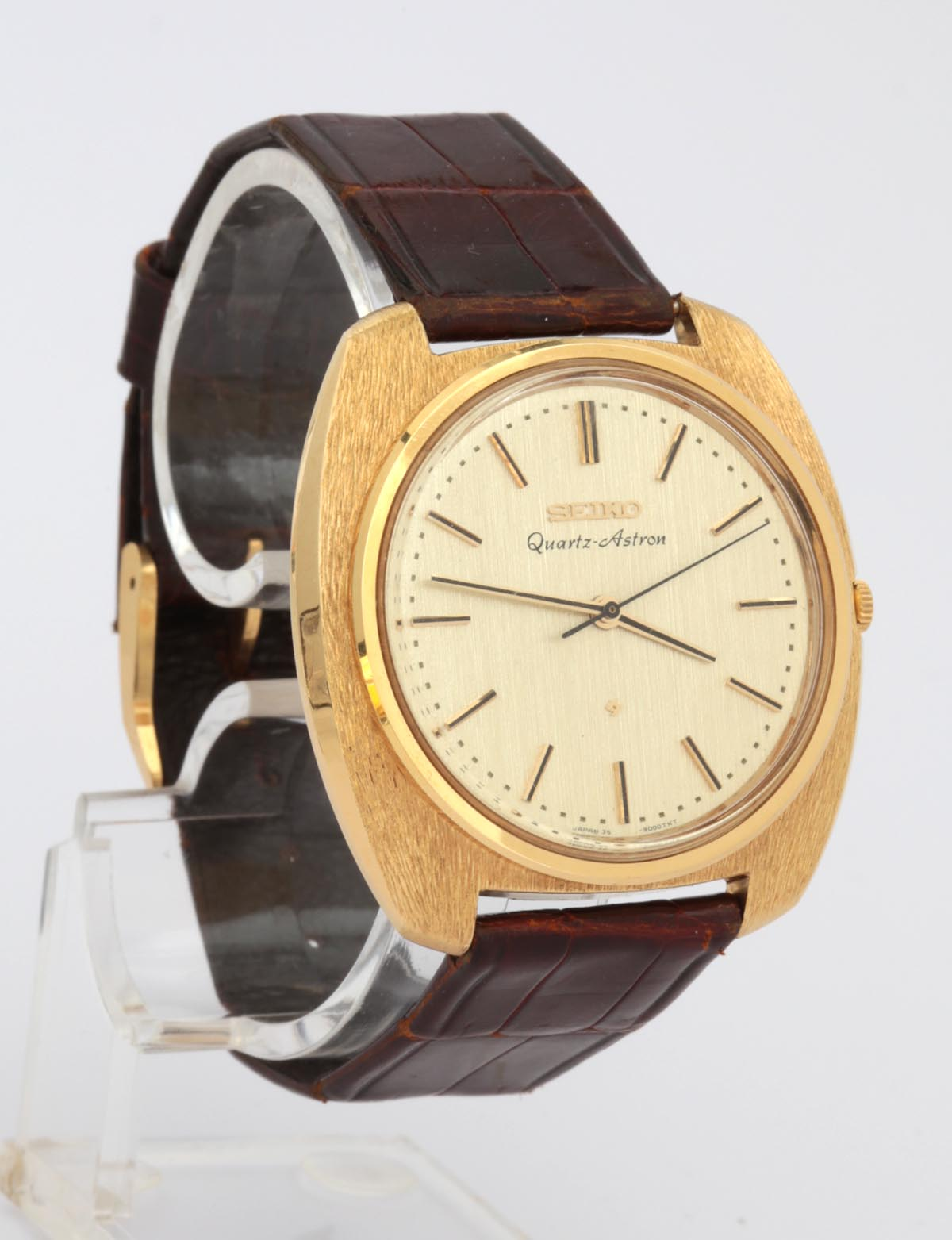
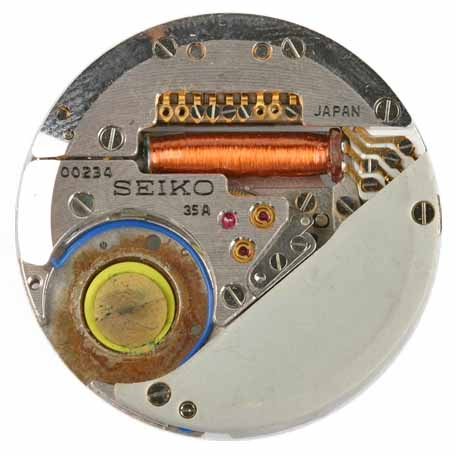
Heritage No. 66 – Seiko Astron (left) and internal mechanism (right) developed by Suwa Seikosha in 1969

No.	Year created	Type	Description	Location	Notes
062		Landmark	Soil and Tractor Museum of Hokkaido	Hokkaido	
063		Landmark	Museum of Agricultural Technology Progress	Saitama prefecture	At the Institution of Agricultural Machinery, part of the National Agriculture and Food Research Organization.
064	1928-1971, operated	Landmark	Telpher of the Port of Shimizu	Shizuoka prefecture	
065		Collection	Japanese snow vehicles KD604 and KD605	Tokyo (KD604) and Akita Prefecture (KD605)	Reached the South Pole in 1968.
066	1913, 1960, 1969	Collection	Japanese wristwatches	Tokyo	Laurel Type 12 (1913); First-generation Grand Seiko (1960); Quartz Astron 35SQ (1969)
067	1879	Collection	Double Housing Planing Machine	Aichi Prefecture	Made by Akabane Engineering Works, Ministry of Industry
068	1954	Collection	Fuji Automatic Massage Machine	Osaka Prefecture	Developed by Nobuo Fujimoto, who created Fuji Seisakusho. (Note: Fuji Medical Devices, a subsidiary of Fujifilm)
069	1932, first edition	Document	The Collection of Drawings for Japanese Machines	Tokyo	Created for the purpose of "disseminating correct knowledge of domestic products to general engineers and serving as reference drawings in terms of teaching mechanical engineering."

== Items certified in 2015 ==
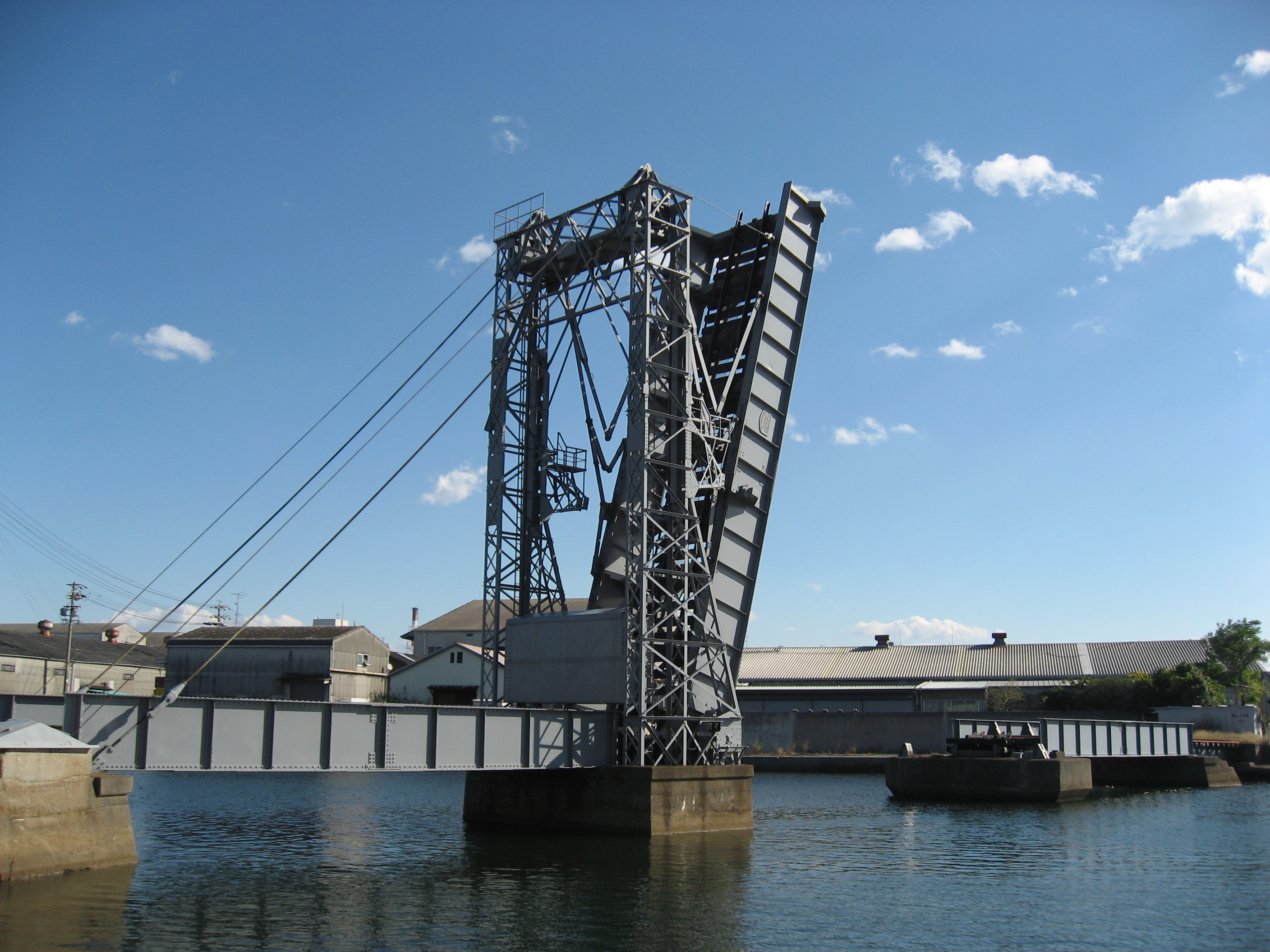
Heritage No. 70 – Railway bascule Bridge Suehiro Kyoryo

No.	Year created	Type	Description	Location	Notes
070	1931	Landmark	Railway bascule bridge Suehiro Kyoryo	Mie Prefecture	
071	1966	Collection	Automatic encrusting machine Model 105	Tochigi Prefecture	The first version of the machine, Model 101, was created in 1963.
072	1951	Collection	Mikasa's automatic transmission	Tokyo	The first Japanese Automatic transmission with torque converter.
073	1949	Collection	First Japanese-made coin counter	Hyogo Prefecture	Made by Kokuei Machinery Manufacturing
074	1936	Collection	Kobayashi-style wood gas engine	Hiroshima Prefecture	
075	1959	Collection	The small once-through boiler Type ZP	Ehime Prefecture	Manufactured by ‘Miura Seisakusho’ Co., Ltd.
076	1977	Collection	Electric industrial robot "MOTOMAN-L10"	Fukuoka Prefecture	

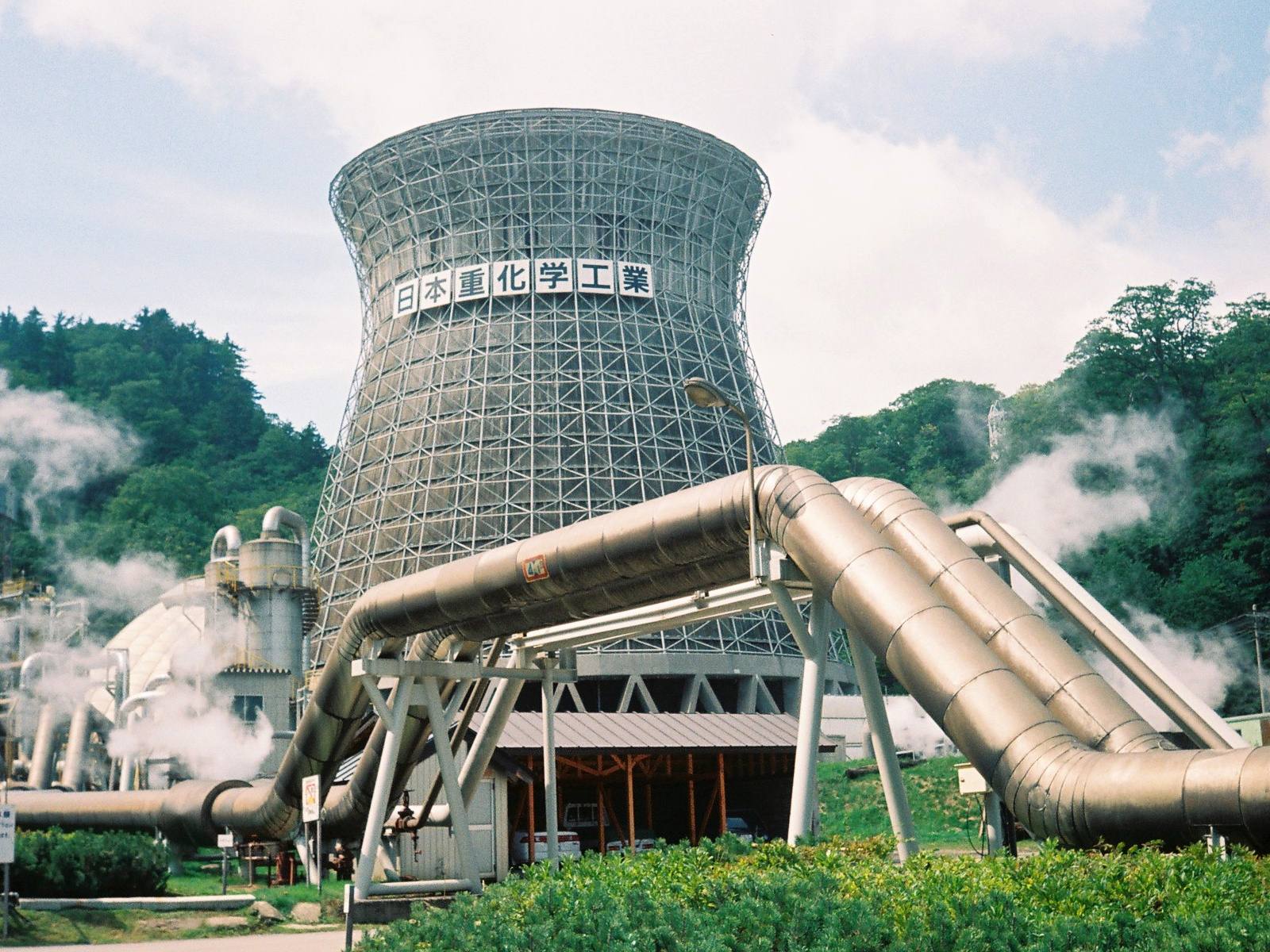
Heritage No. 77 – Matsukawa geothermal power station in Iwate, Japan

== Items certified in 2016 ==
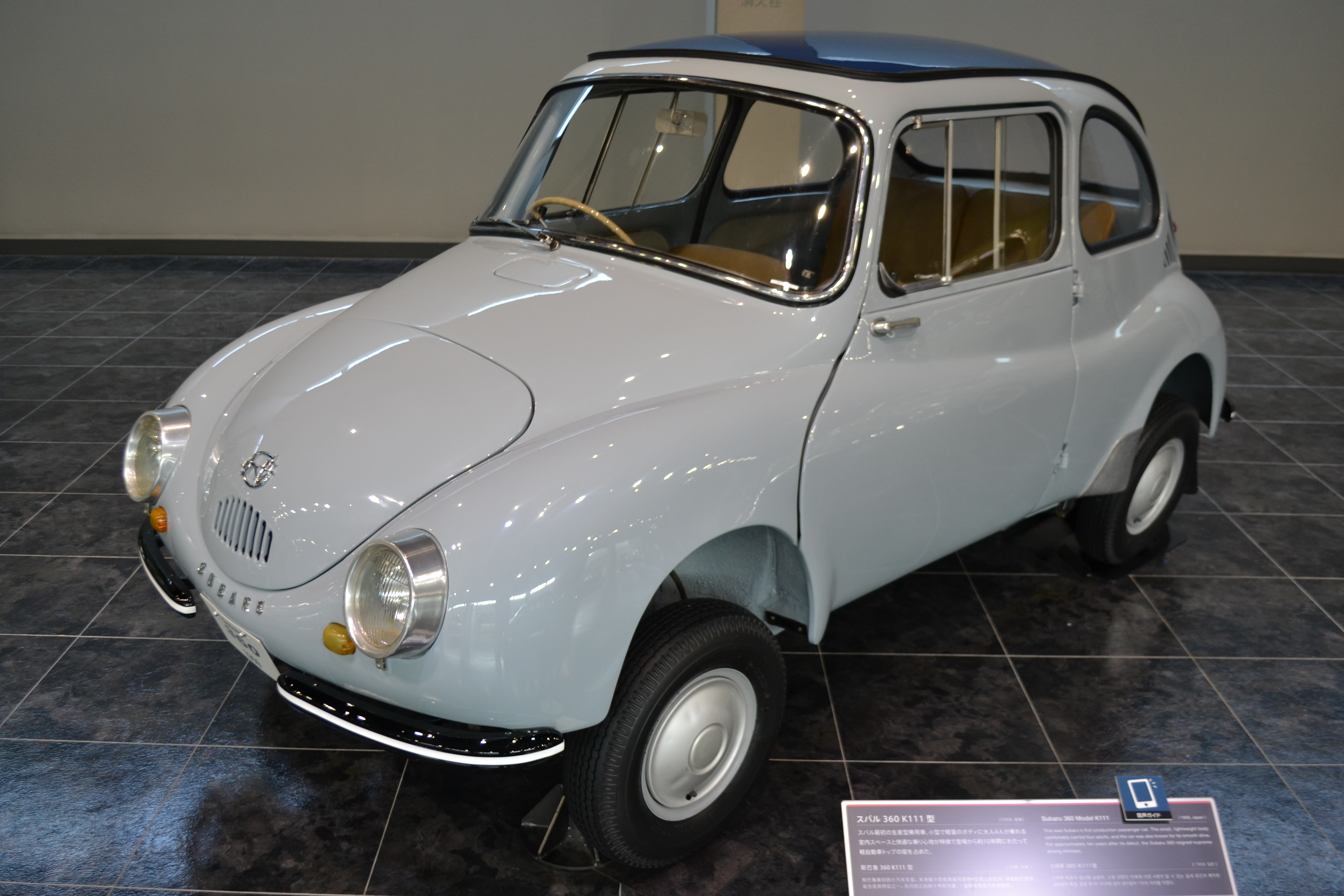
Heritage No. 78 – Subaru 360 K111, on display at Toyota Automobile Museum, Yokomichi, Nagakute, Aichi.

No.	Year created	Type	Description	Location	Notes
077	1966, began operations	Landmark	Matsukawa Geothermal Power Plant	Iwate Prefecture	The first commercial power plant in Japan.
078	1958	Collection	Subaru 360 Model K111	Gunma Prefecture	Nicknamed tentoumushi (てんとう虫) means ladybug
079	1911	Collection	Double expansion marine steam engine	Saitama Prefecture	Was used on the Tachibana maru (Kanji: たちばな丸), a small wooden steamship
080	1916	Collection	Itoki Shoten's Zeni-ai-ki, a simple cash register	Tokyo	
081	1919	Collection	Gasoline measuring equipment type No. 25	Kanagawa Prefecture	Created by Uchu Tatsuno, the founder of Tatsuno Seisakusho
082	1962	Collection	Gate-type car wash machine	Aichi Prefecture	
083	1870	Collection	Optical instruments of the Kashinosaki Lighthouse	Wakayama Prefecture	A rotating flash lamp lighthouse.

== Items certified in 2017 ==
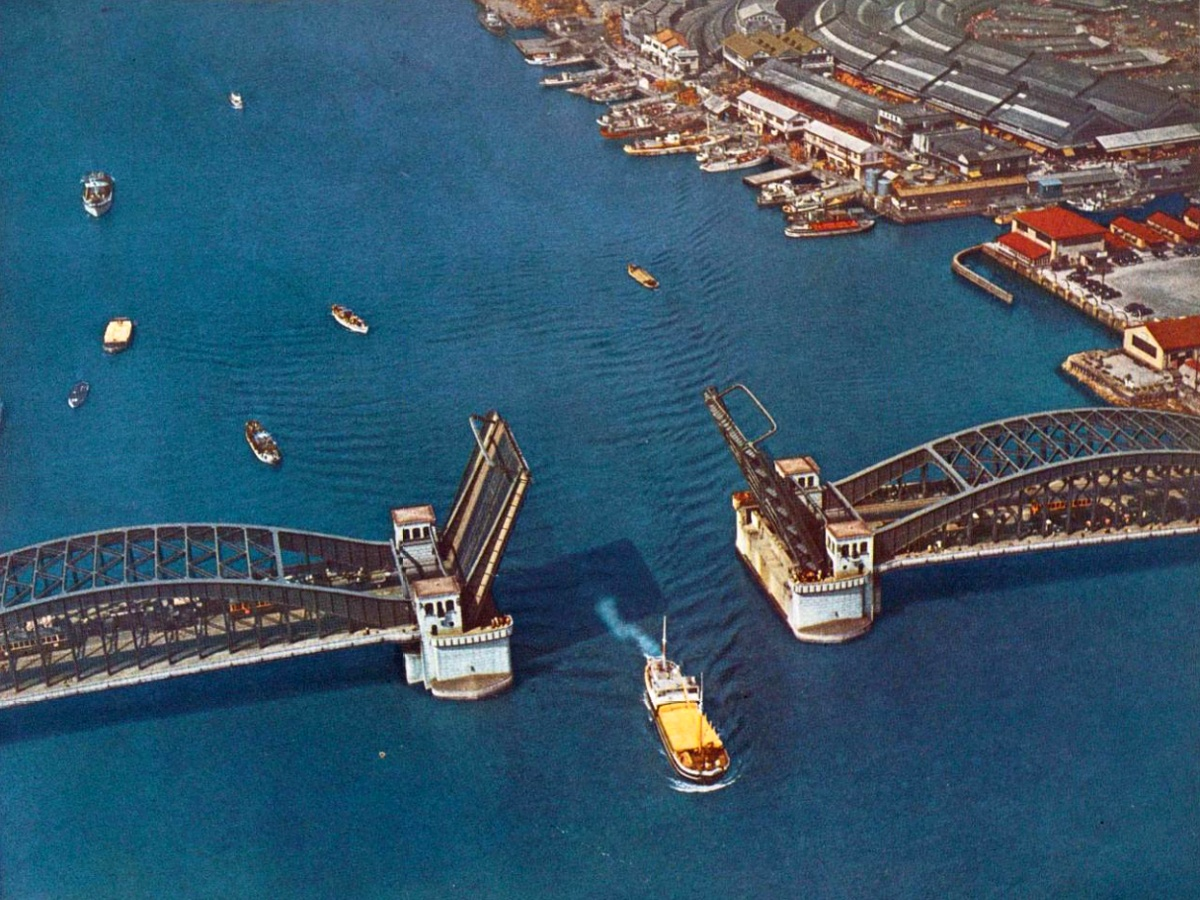
Heritage No. 84 – Kachidoki bridge over Sumida River, connecting Tsukiji and Tsukishima

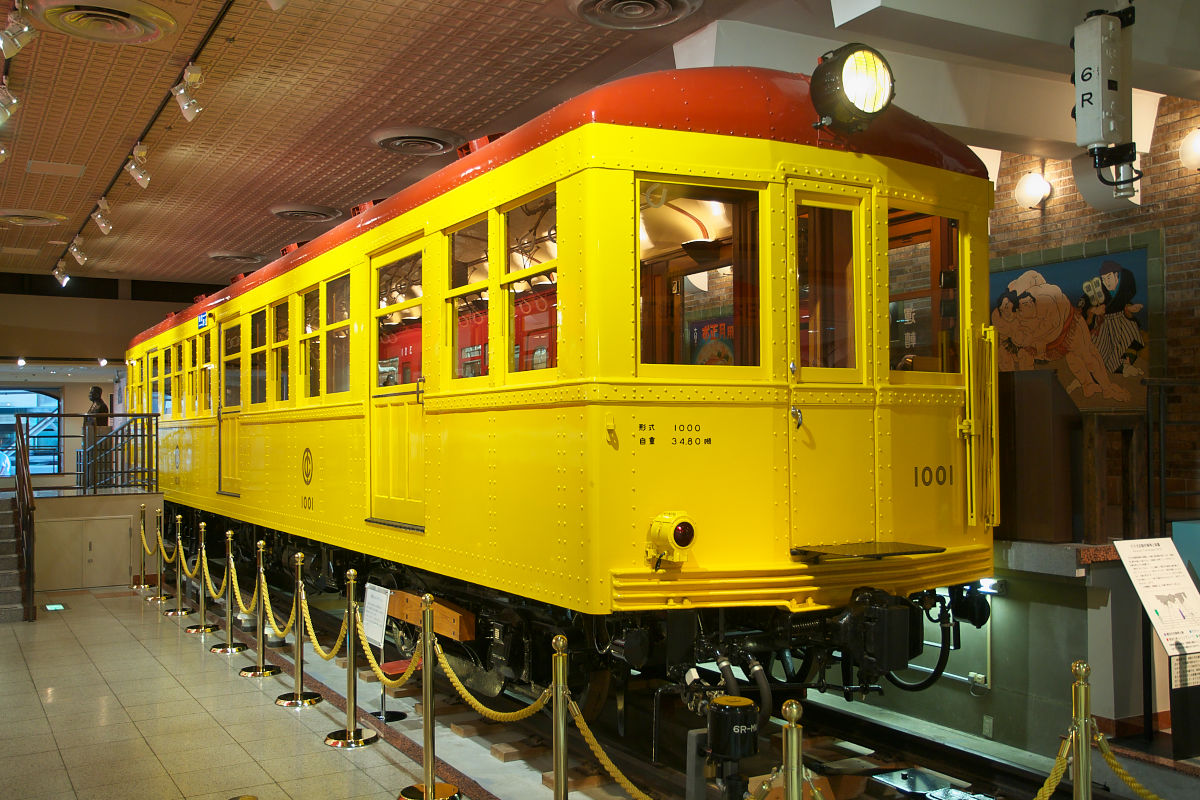
Heritage No. 86 – Tokyo Metro 1000 series 1001 at the Tokyo Metro Museum

No.	Year created	Type	Description	Location	Notes
084	1940	Site	Kachidoki Bridge (勝鬨橋), a bascule type bridge	Tokyo	Sits over the Sumida River
085	1966	Site	The jet fan that is used for ventilation in the Okuda Tunnel on the Kitakyushu Urban Expressway	Osaka Prefecture	
086	1927	Collection	The first electric railcar for the Tokyo Metro Ginza Line that traveled between Ueno Station and Asakusa Station	Tokyo	
087	1981	Collection	Deep submergence research vehicle Shinkai 2000	Kanagawa Prefecture	
088	1927	Collection	Green sand molding machine Type C-11	Aichi Prefecture	Developed by Chotaro Kubota of Kubota Chuzousho
089	1973	Collection	Multihead weigher ACW-M-1	Shiga Prefecture	Manufactured by Ishida Scales Mfg. Co., Ltd.
090	1964	Collection	A fully automatic glove knitting machine for cotton work gloves	Wakayama Prefecture	

== Items certified in 2018 ==
No.	Year created	Type	Description	Location	Notes
091	1987	Collection	Historical machine tools collected by Nippon Institute of Technology	Saitama Prefecture	232 exhibits are arranged chronologically and by type
092	1959/1962	Collection	Airless spray painting equipment	Aichi Prefecture	The airless spray gun was developed in 1959 and the spray pump was improved from a U.S. patent in 1962
093	1968	Collection	Cathode ray tube funnel pressing machine	Siga Prefecture	Developed by Nippon Electric Glass Co., Ltd.
094	1934	Collection	A type casting machine on display at the museum of Kumamoto Daily News	Kumamoto Prefecture	Produced by Eizo Hayashi, president of Rinyeisha Co. at that time.

== Items certified in 2019 ==
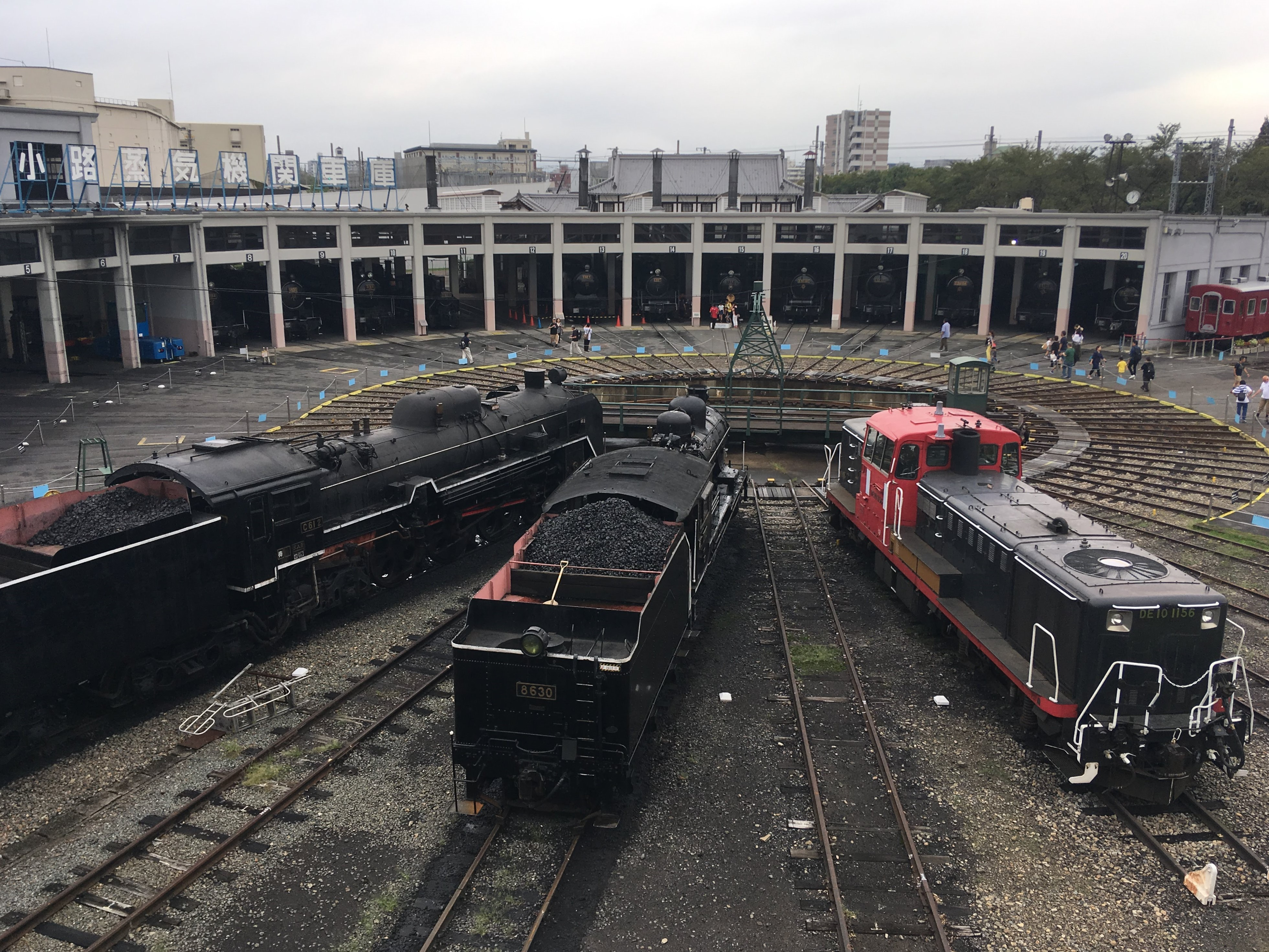
Heritage No. 97 – Roundhouse of the Kyoto Railway Museum, 8 of the 23 displayed locomotives are still functional as well as the inspection equipment that was built in 1915

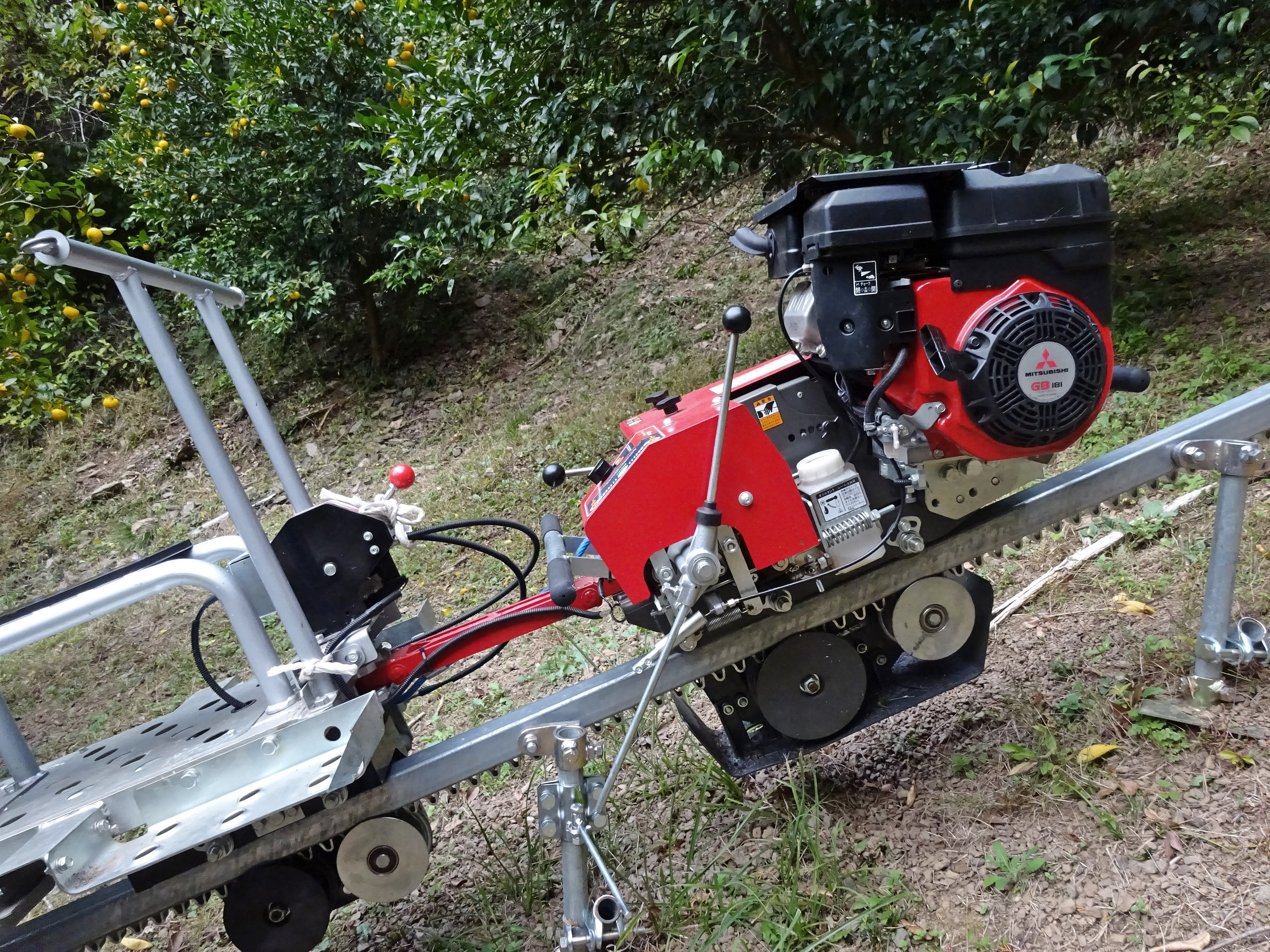
Heritage No. 99 – a Nikkari monorack

No.	Year created	Type	Description	Location	Notes
095	1945	Landmark	Conduit gate of Tase Dam	Iwate Prefecture	
096	1916	Landmark	Oil mining and refine system at Kanazu oilfield	Niigata Prefecture	
097	1880-1948	Landmark	Kyoto Railway Museum steam locomotives and related objects.	Kyoto Prefecture	23 steam locomotives used until 1984, maintenance facility and records are also preserved.
098	1915	Collection	Dawn of Japanese passenger elevator.	Fukui Prefecture	Push-button type fully automatic elevator developed by Takatoki Tomatsu
099	1966	Collection	Monorack M-1, a monorail built on the steep slopes of the ria coast of the Seto Inland Sea to assist with hauling produce out of the orchards.	Okayama Prefecture	Developed by Japan Karitoriki Kogyo (now known as Nikkari)

== Items certified in 2020 ==
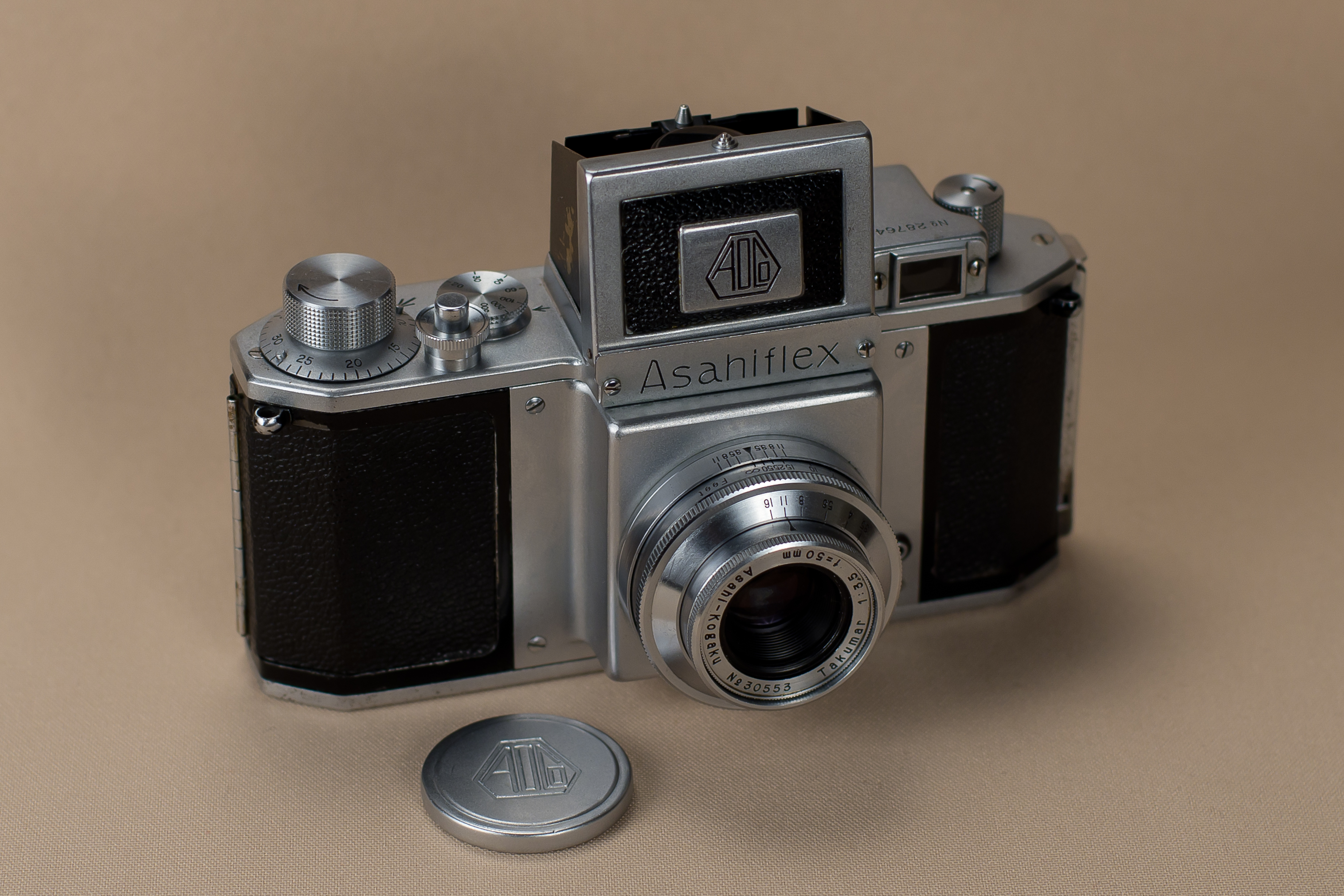
Heritage No. 101 – Asahiflex I from 1952

No.	Year created	Type	Description	Location	Notes
100		Collection & Documents	Educational equipment for mechanical engineering from the Imperial College of Engineering (工部大学校, Kōbu Daigakko) and related documents from Imperial College students and mechanics teacher C.D. West	Tokyo	
101	1950s	Collection	5 single-lens reflex cameras from the 1950s at JCII Camera Museum	Tokyo	Asahiflex I (Note: 1952); IIB (Note: 1954); Miranda T (Note: 1955); Zunow (Note: 1958); Nikon F (Note: 1959)
102	1928	Collection	Jiyuzo Nara (自由造 奈良, Jiyuzo Nara) high-speed impact mill	Tokyo	
103	1921	Collection	Electric arc spray gun from the early era of thermal spraying.	Siga Prefecture	Introduced and patented by Kenjiro Ezawa
104	1952	Collection	A ring cone (RC) continuously variable transmission (CVT)	Kyoto	

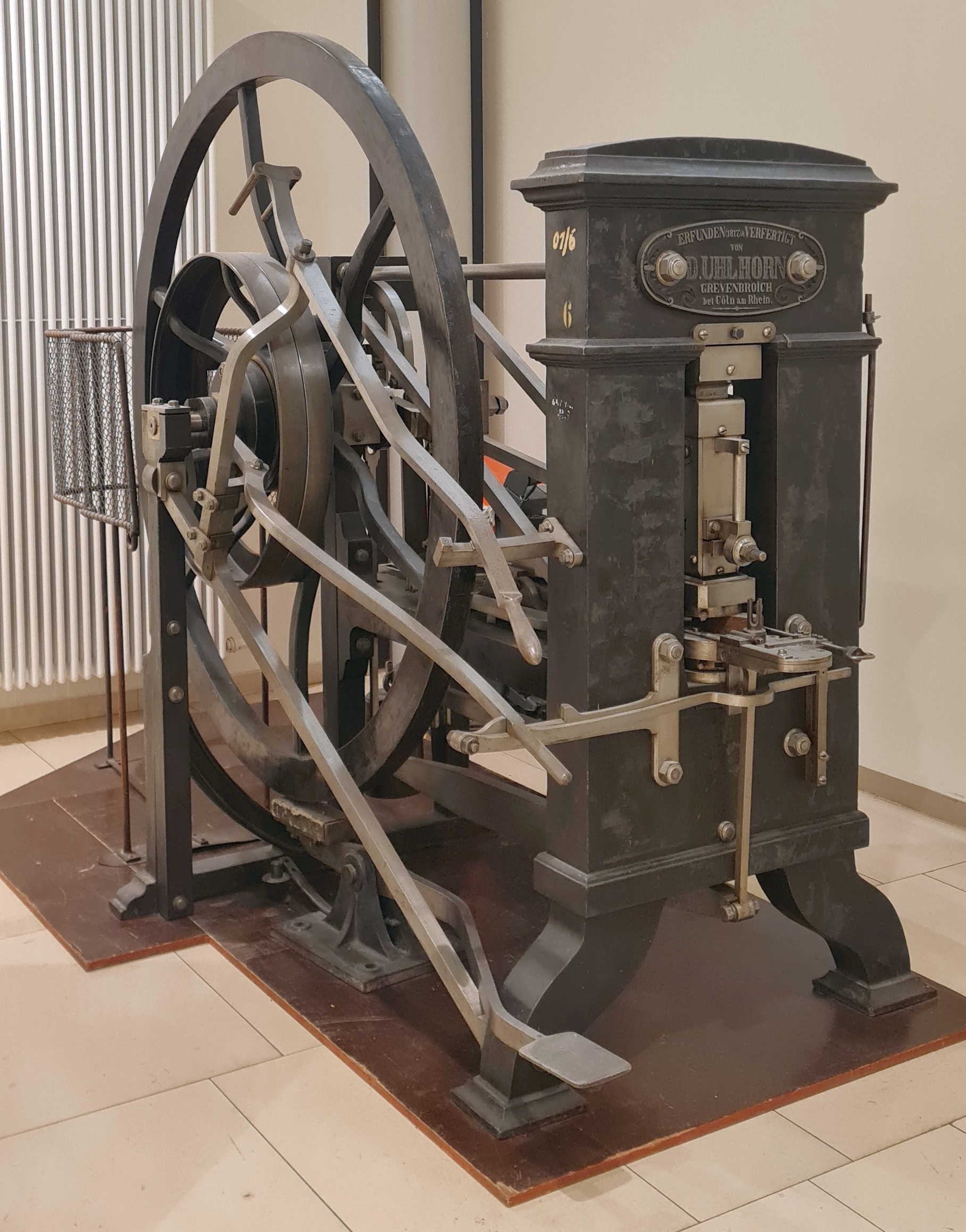
Heritage No. 111 – The German-made Uhlhorn Münzprägemaschine

== Items certified in 2021 ==
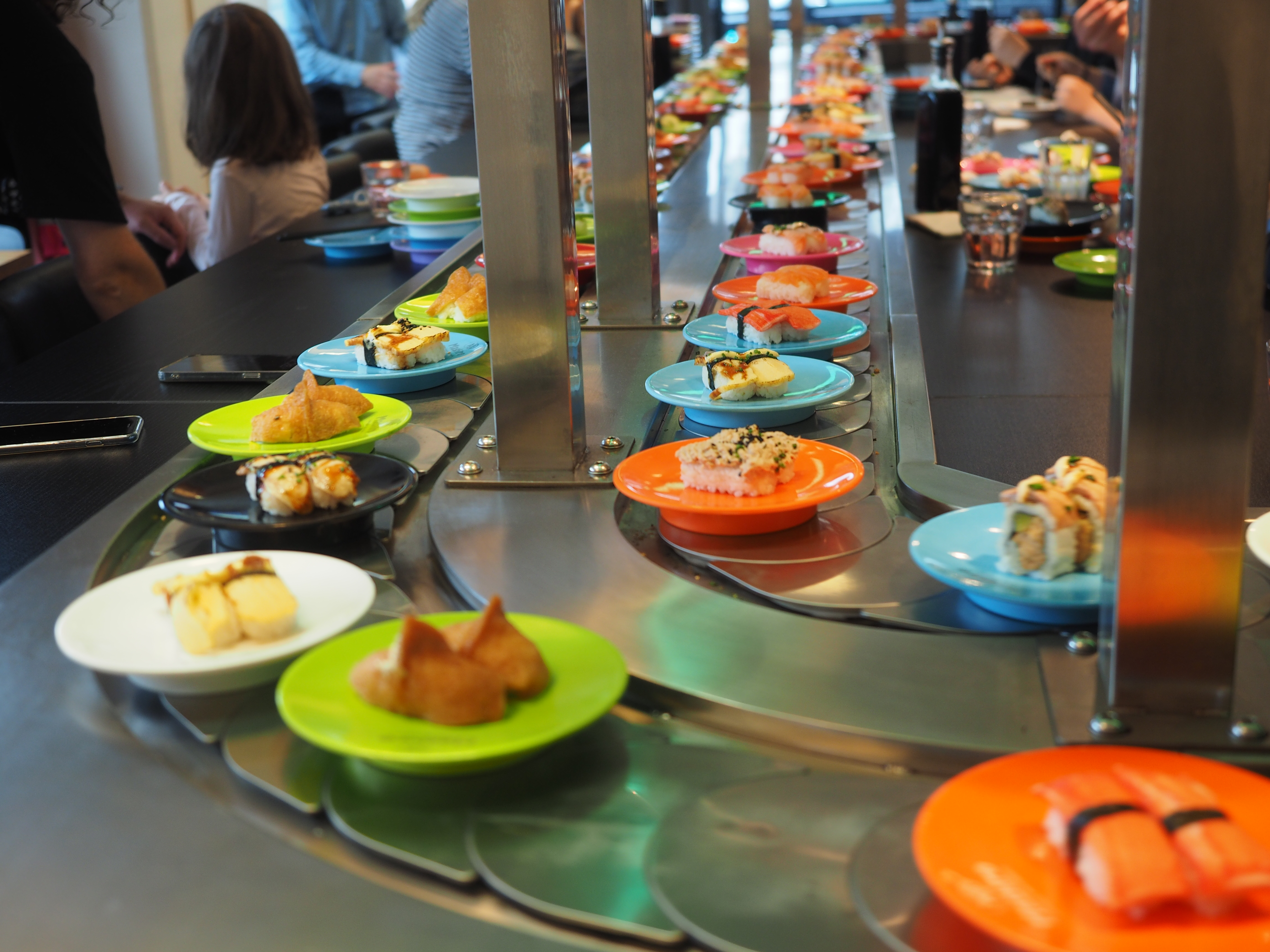
Heritage No. 113 – Conveyor belt sushi at Mashiro Sushi

No.	Year created	Type	Description	Location	Notes
105	1957	Collection	Electric milking machine DK-5 II	Nagano Prefecture	Developed by Kyoei Seiki Co.
106	1930	Collection	Spur gear grinding machine Type ASG-2	Saitama Prefecture	Designed by Kakusaburo Okamoto (ja:岡本 覚三郎, Okamoto Kakusaburo) with Okamoto Machine Tool Works, Ltd. (ja:岡本工作機械製所) for the Kure Naval Arsenal
107	1981	Collection	Automatic sushi machine	Saitama Prefecture	Developed by Suzumo Machinery Co., LTD. (ja:鈴茂器工株式会社)
108	1959	Collection	Rolling stock Test Stand for Shinkansen	Tokyo	Created by Hitachi and installed by Japanese National Railways
109	1958	Collection	Pitching machines Catapult type：KS-P and AR	Tokyo (KS-P) and Gifu Prefecture (AR)	Designed by Hachio Saito (ja:斉藤八雄, Saito Hachio) and manufactured by Kumagai Gumi Co., Ltd. and Chunichi Stadium Co., Ltd.
110	1958	Collection	Electric hand planer Model 1000	Aichi Prefecture	
111	1871	Collection	The German-made Uhlhorn (Note: German: Uhlhorn Münzprägemaschine) and the French-made Thonnelier (Note: French: Presse Montaire de Thonnelier) coin presses from the founding of the Japan Mint	Osaka Prefecture	On display at the Japan Mint Museum
112	1958	Collection	Conveyor belt sushi machine, Origin of the new food culture	Osaka Prefecture	Invented by Yoshiaki Shiraishi (ja:白石 義明, Shiraishi Yoshiaki)
113	1975	Collection	Silent Piler KGK-100A, hydraulic pile press-in and extraction machinery	Kochi Prefecture	Developed jointly by Akio Kitamura (ja:北村精男, Kitamura Akio) and Yasuo Kakiuchi (ja:垣内保男, Kakiuchi Yasuo)

== Items certified in 2022 ==
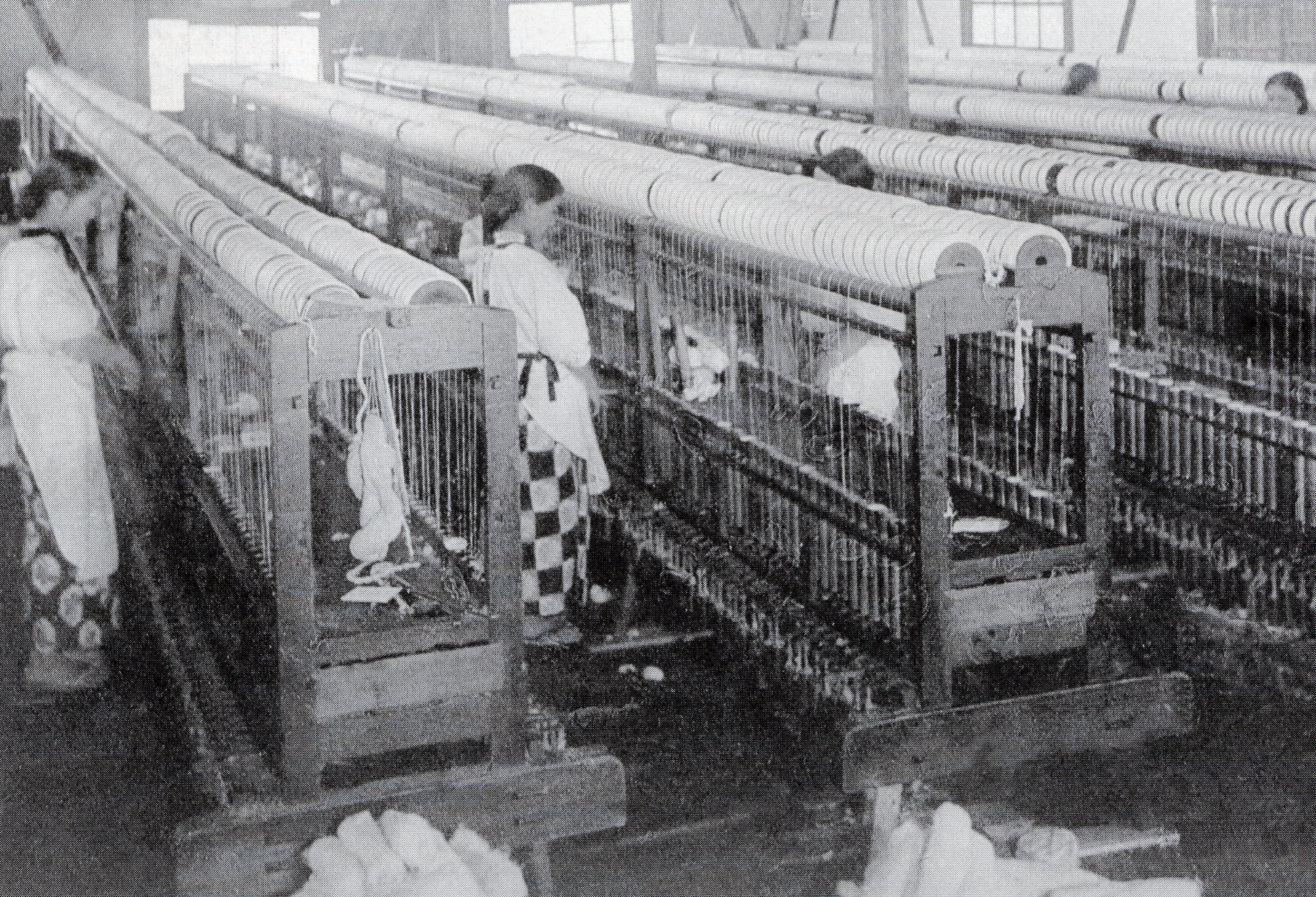
Heritage No. 116 – Gara bo spinning machines in use in 1937

No.	Year created	Type	Description	Location	Notes
114	1953	Collection	Surface grinding machine PSG-6B	Gunma Prefecture	Manufactured by Okamoto Machine Tool Works, Ltd. (ja:岡本工作機械製所)
115	1985	Collection	Timber pre-cut system MPS-1	Aichi Prefecture	Created by Miyagawa Koki (ja:宮川工機)
116	1880s	Collection	Gaun-shiki bousyokuki (ja:臥雲式紡織機) or Gara bo, a hand-cranked spinning machine	Osaka Prefecture	Invented by Gaun Tatsumune (ja:臥雲辰致) and nicknamed Gara Bo because of the sound that the machine makes Gara Gara Bousyokuki:Gara Gara cotton-spinning machine, (ja:ガラ紡)

== Items certified in 2023 ==
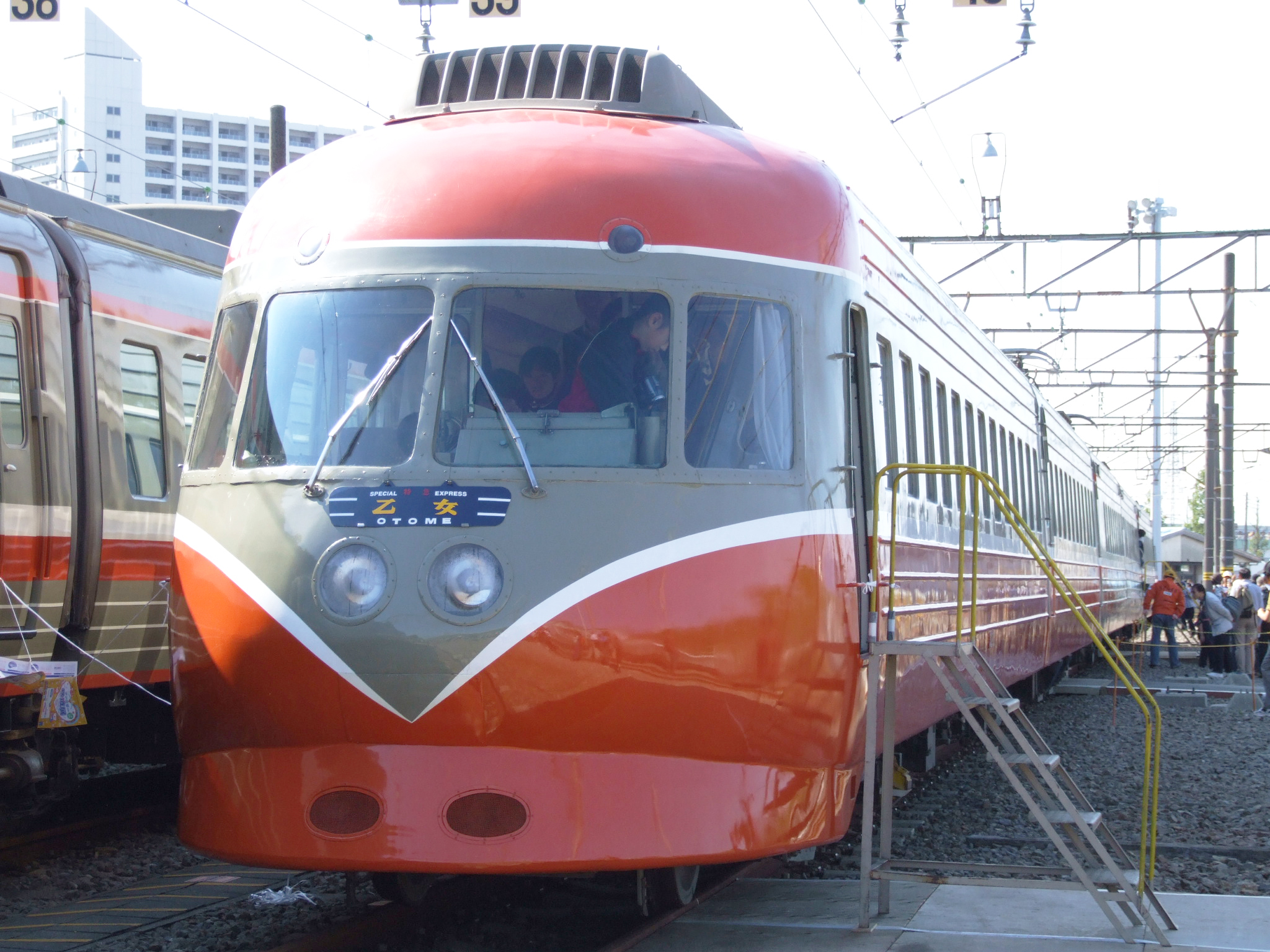
Heritage No. 118 – Model 3000, Odakyu RomanceCar SE, Odakyu Electric Railway, Japan

No.	Year created	Type	Description	Location	Notes
117	1959	Collection	Goto planetarium Type M-1	Tokyo	
118	1957	Collection	Odakyu 3000 series SE	Kanagawa Prefecture	On display in the Romancecar Museum
119	1831	Collection	A "pharmaceutical millstone" in Wachusanhompo (now known as Ritto City, Shiga prefecture)	Shiga Prefecture	Was used to make wachusan (stomach medicine) during the Edo period
120	17th century to present	Collection	Historical machine tools at the Sankyo Machine Tools Museum	Shizuoka Prefecture	137 tools ranging from the 17th century to the modern era

== Items certified in 2024 ==
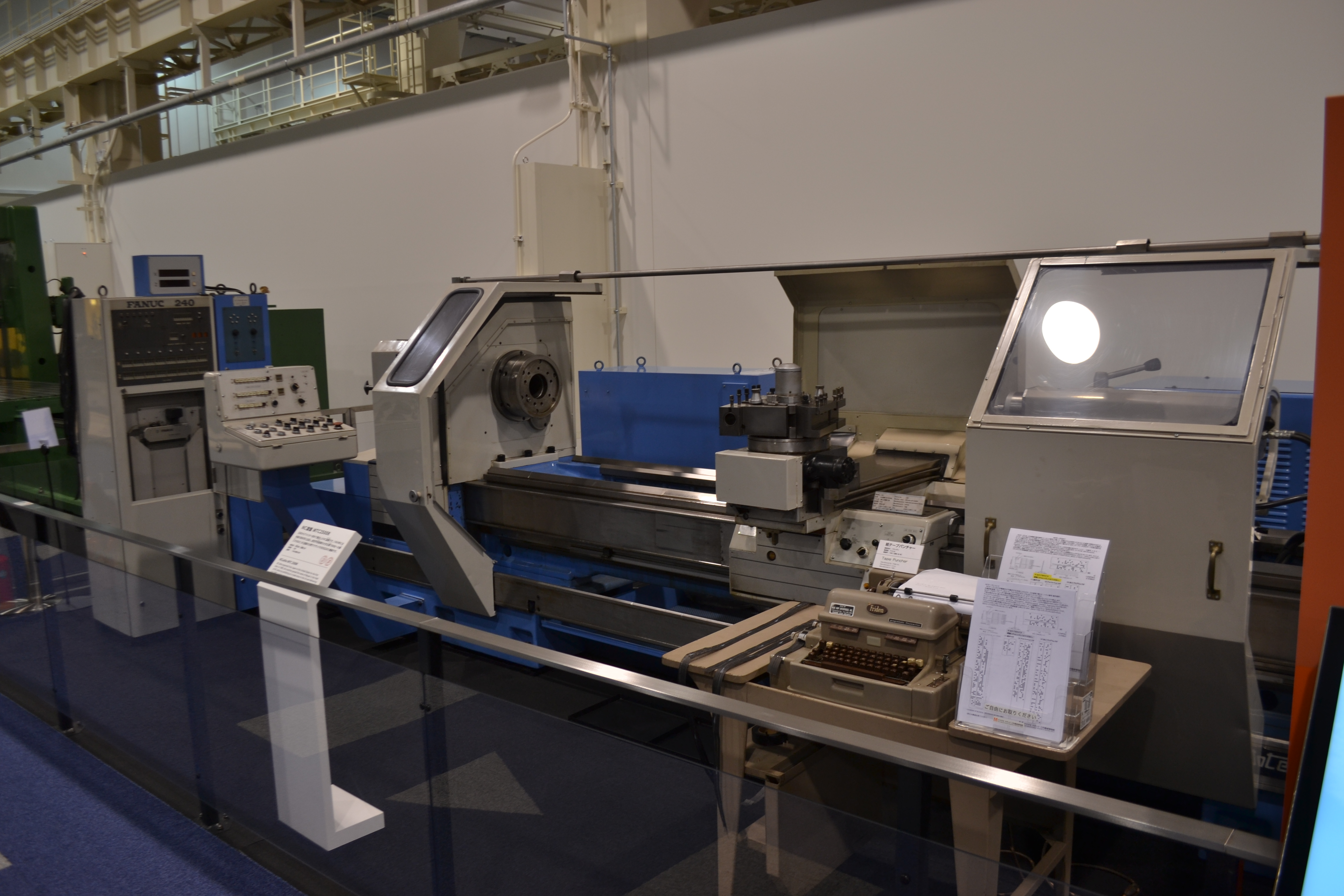
Heritage No. 126 – Mazak NC Lathe MTC-2500R

No.	Year created	Type	Description	Location	Notes
121	1930, patented	Collection	Arai gara-pon lottery wheel	Aomori Prefecture	Developed by Takuya Arai
122	1964	Collection	Sugino Machine Limited (ja:スギノマシン) high-pressure triple plunge pump	Toyama Prefecture	
123	1968	Collection	Macadam road roller Sakai R1	Saitama Prefecture	Manufactured by Sakai Kosakusho
124	1951	Collection	K-1 strain gauge with red felt	Tokyo	Developed by Kyowa Electronic Instruments Co., Ltd.
125	1926	Collection	Marinoni-type rotary printing press with folding mechanism	Kanagawa Prefecture	On display at Nihon Shimbun Museum News Park
126	1968	Collection	Mazak numerical control (NC) lathe MTC-2500R	Gifu Prefecture	Created by Yamazaki Iron Works Co., Ltd.

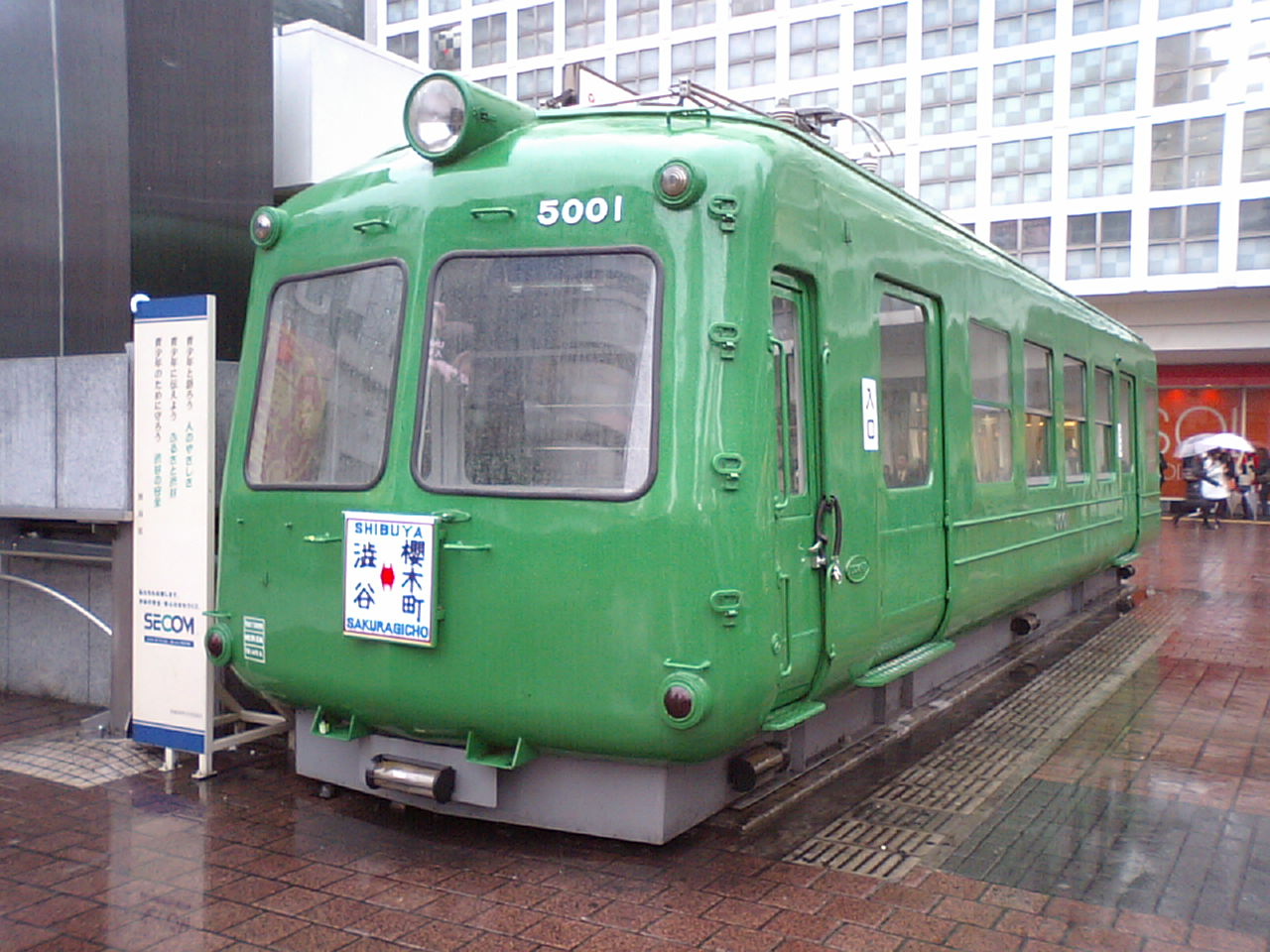
Heritage No. 128 – Tōkyū 5000 series, Deha 5001 (pictured) was preserved in front of Shibuya Station, Tokyo, and functioned as a tourist information center, it was relocated to Ōdate, Akita in June 2020

== Items certified in 2025 ==
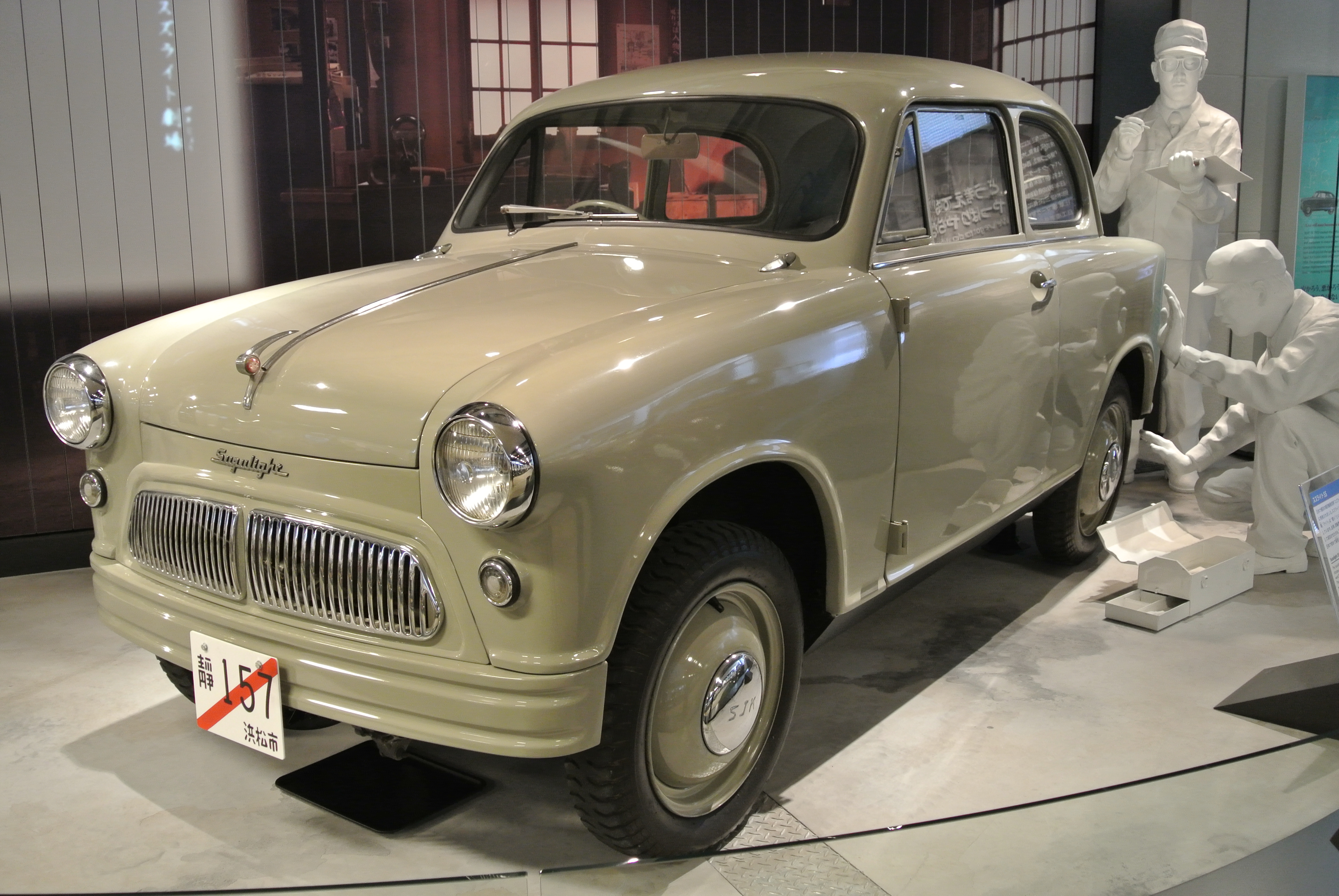
Heritage No. 132 – the Suzulight SS at the Suzuki History Museum

No.	Year created	Type	Description	Location	Notes
127	1952	Collection	Corona gas oil heater Type SB, a pressurized oil stove	Niigata Prefecture	Developed by Tetsue Uchida
128	1954	Collection	Tōkyū Car Corporation's all-steel high-speed commuter train, the Tōkyū 5000 series	Kanagawa Prefecture	
129	1959	Collection	FACOM 128B, a relay computer	Shizuoka Prefecture	Developed by Fuji Communication Equipment Manufacturing Company
130	1913	Collection	The silk spinning machines of the Shinshu University Faculty of Textile Science and Technology	Nagano Prefecture	
131	1968	Collection	The EP-101 miniature digital printer for electronic desktop calculators	Nagano Prefecture	Created by Suwa Seikosha
132	1954	Collection	Suzuki Suzulight SS	Shizuoka Prefecture	Developed by Saburo Suzuki

== Items certified in 2026 ==
No.	Year created	Type	Description	Location	Notes
133	1926 - 1928	Collection	Suhara High Speed Cameras TypeⅠ(20,000 frames/second)&Ⅱ(45,000 frames/second)are displayed. Type III achieved (60,000 frames/second)	Ibaraki Prefecture	Developed by Toyotaro Suhara
134	1936	Collection	Micrometer.	Kanagawa Prefecture	Mitutoyo modeled after a Johansson (Sweden) product.
135	Estimated 1951	Collection	Music box movement	Nagano Prefecture	A Japanese woman moved to the United States in 1990 happened to find and purchase this in Arizona around 2000，returned to Japan in 2024, then donated it to produce company, Sankyo Seiki Manufacturing Co., Ltd. (now Nidec)
136	1938	Collection	Elevator traction machine using two steps speed AC motor	Aichi Prefecture	Smooth variable-speed at lower cost than DC motor. Lifting speed 45 m/min and load capacity of 1,600 kg, Mitsubishi Electric.
137	1955	Collection	Tableting machine	Kyoto Prefecture	Production capacity of 400 tablets per minute. Kikusui Seisakusho Ltd.(菊水製作所) Kyoto
138	1934	Documents	Steam Table and Diagrams of JSME	Tokyo	Steam Table and Diagrams (蒸汽表と線図) published by JSME (Japan Society of Mechanical Engineers)

== See also ==
- List of historic mechanical engineering landmarks
- List of historic civil engineering landmarks
- Sites of Japan's Meiji Industrial Revolution: Iron and Steel, Shipbuilding and Coal Mining
