= Inokuchi Ariya =

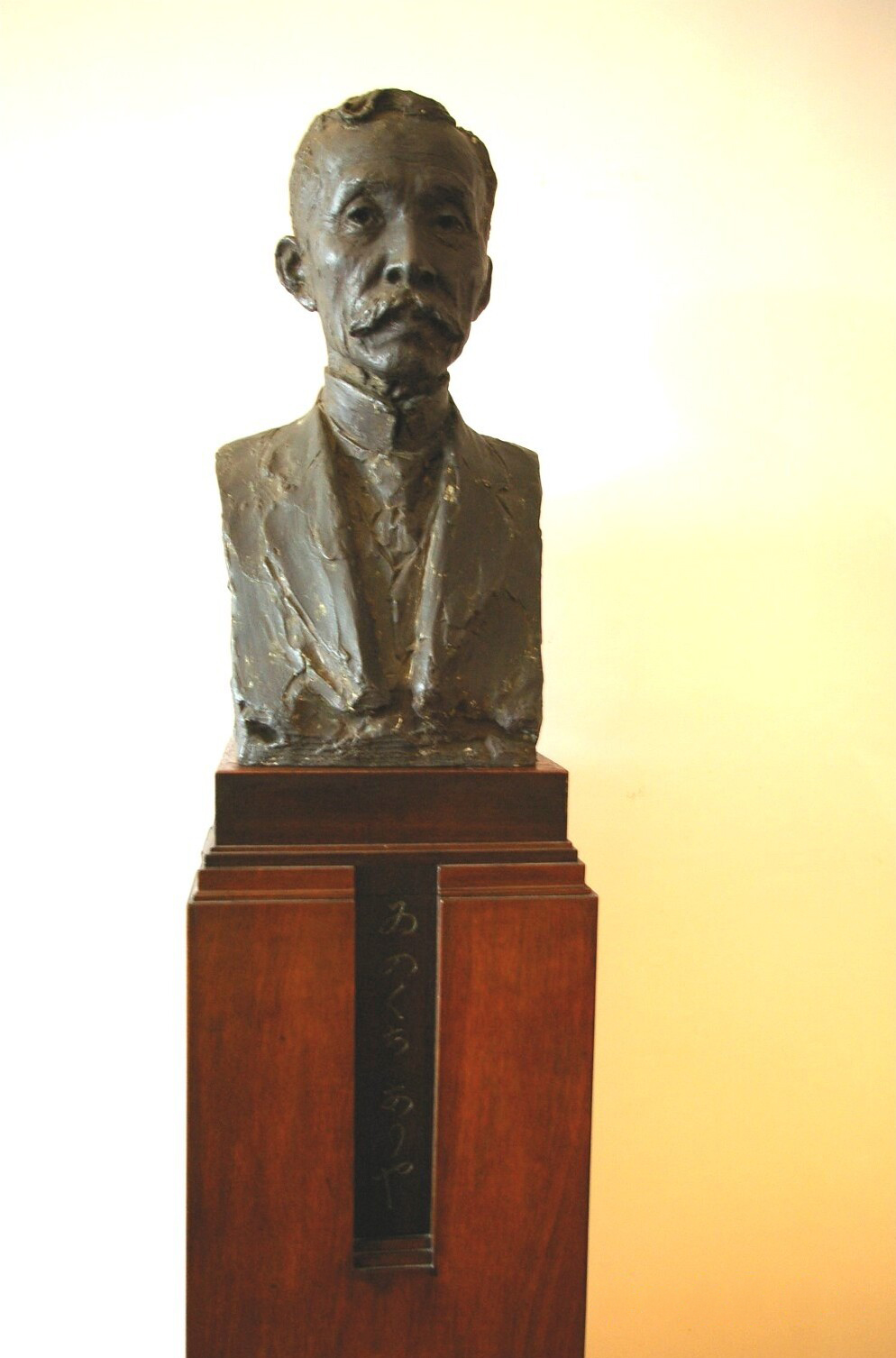
Statue of Dr. Inokuchi Aria University of Tokyo

Inokuchi Ariya (井口 在屋; November 27, 1856 - March 25, 1923) was a mechanical technologist and professor. He was born in Kanazawa, and graduated from the University of Tokyo Kōgakubu (mechanical course). In Meiji 29 (1896), he was installed in the University of Tokyo professor. He invented an Inoguchi shiki turbine pump (Inokuchi type turboalternator). He established Nihon Kikai Gakkai (Japan Institute of Mechanical Engineers)

He is founder of Ebara Corporation (former: Inokuchi Seisakusho- lit. Inokuchi manufacturing/works) in 1920.

== See also ==
- Mechanical Engineering Heritage (Japan) - Heritage No.25
