= Ebara Corporation =

Japanese manufacturing company

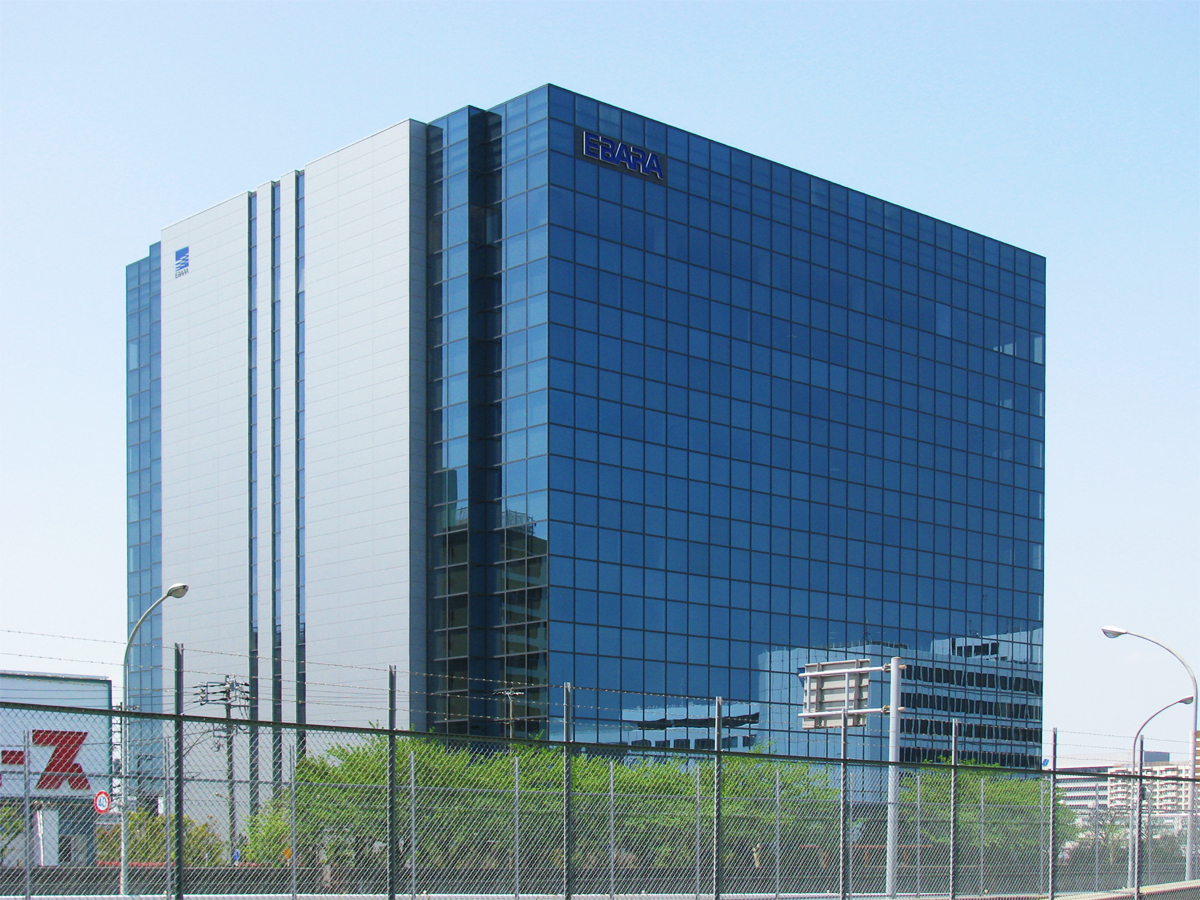
- Type: Public (K.K)
- Traded as: TYO: 6361; Nikkei 225 Component
- Industry: Machinery
- Founded: Tokyo, Japan (November 1912; 114 years ago)
- Founder: Issei Hatakeyama; Inokuchi Ariya
- Headquarters: 11-1, Haneda Asahi-cho, Ota-ku, Tokyo 144-8510, Japan
- Key people: Masao Asami (Chairman), Shugo Hosoda (President, CEO, COO)
- Products: Pumps; Gas compressors; Chillers; Cooling towers; Blowers; Solid waste treatment facilities; Water and wastewater treatment facilities
- Revenue: ▲$ 5.5 billion (FY 2023) (¥ 759.32 billion) (FY 2023)
- Net income: ▲$ 400 million (FY 2023) (¥ 60.28 billion) (FY 2023)
- Number of employees: 15,168 (consolidated as of March 31, 2014)
- Website: Official website

Ebara Corporation is a publicly traded manufacturing company based in Tokyo, Japan which makes environmental and industrial machinery such as pumps and turbines. It is the owner of the Elliott Company in the United States and Sumoto S.r.l. in Italy. Ebara also operates through its "WaterKiosk" partnership to supply clean drinking water in Kenya.

== Organization ==
Ebara is divided into three main divisions:

- Fluid Machinery & Systems Company, which produces:
  - Pumps: standard and engineered pumps and pumping system engineering
  - Turbines: Gas and steam turbines of various sizes, including micro gas turbines
  - Turbo-compressors, blowers, and fans
  - Chillers
- Precision Machinery Company which produces:
  - CMP, Plating, and Cleaning systems
  - Dry vacuum and turbo-molecular pumps
  - Gas scrubber systems
  - Ozonized water generators
  - Chemical filters
- Environmental Engineering Company, which produces:
  - Water treatment and sewage and industrial wastewater systems
  - Solid waste processing/utilization systems
  - Gas treatment systems
  - Environmental remediation services
  - Plant operation & maintenance services

== See also ==
- Ariya Inokuchi
