= Tokyu 5000 series (1954) =

Japanese train type

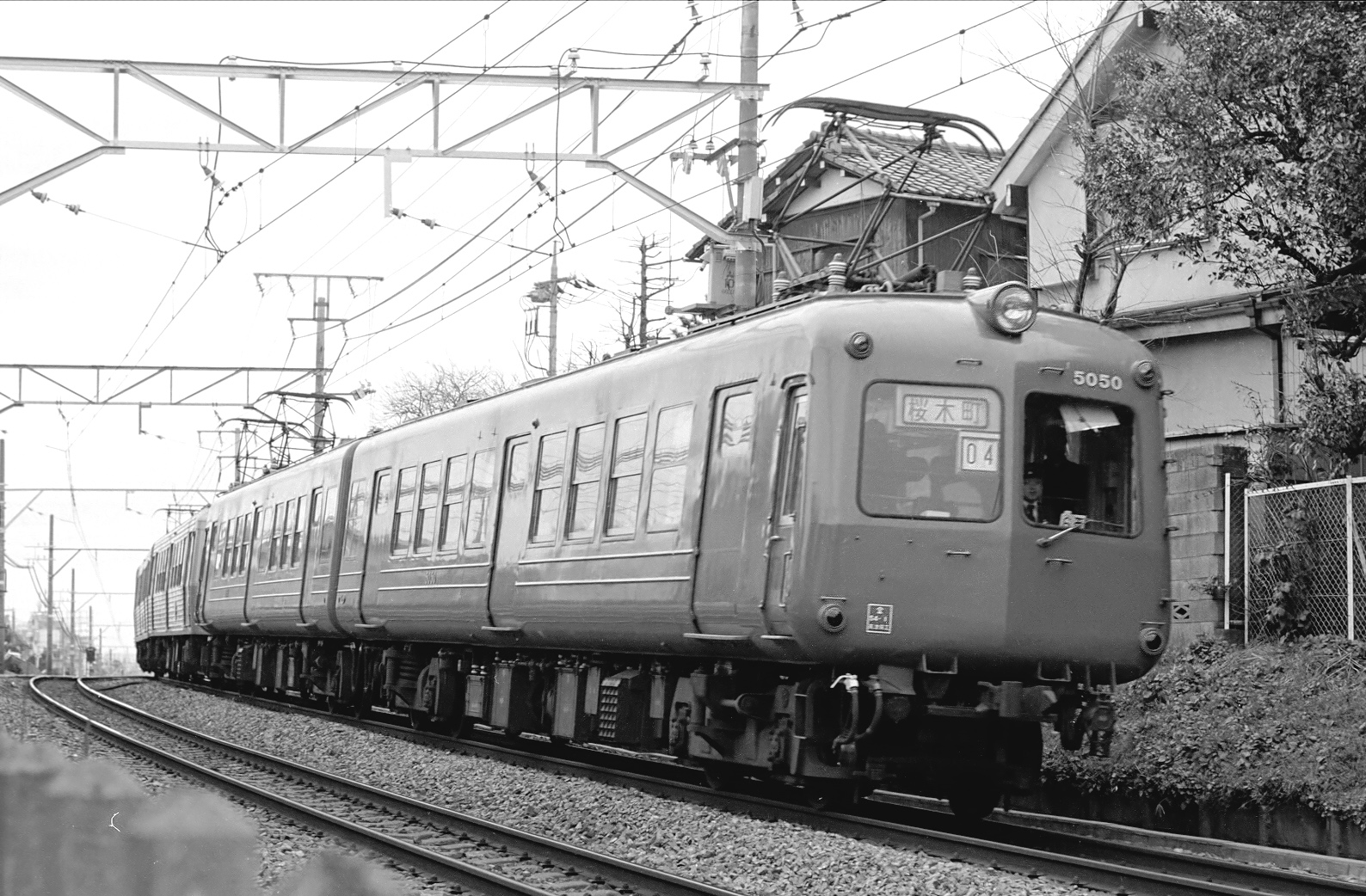
- A 5000 series and a 5200 series train on the Tokyu Toyoko Line in March 1980
- In service: 1954–1986
- Manufacturer: Tokyu Car
- Constructed: 1954–1959
- Entered service: October 16, 1954
- Number built: 105 cars
- Formation: 3–6 cars per trainset
- Operators: Tokyu Corporation; Various local private railways

Specifications
- Car length: 18,000 mm (59 ft 1 in)
- Doors: 3 per side
- Electric system(s): 1,500 V DC overhead lines
- Current collection: Pantograph
- Bogies: TS-301
- Track gauge: 1,067 mm (3 ft 6 in)

The Tokyu 5000 series (東急5000系, Tōkyū 5000-kei) was an electric multiple unit (EMU) train type operated by the private railway operator Tokyu Corporation in Japan from 1954 until 1986.

== Specifications ==
=== Formations ===
The trains were formed as three-car sets, and were later lengthened to up to six cars per trainset.

=== Interior ===
The interior consisted of longitudinal seating. The heat of the resistors could be used to heat the passenger compartments.

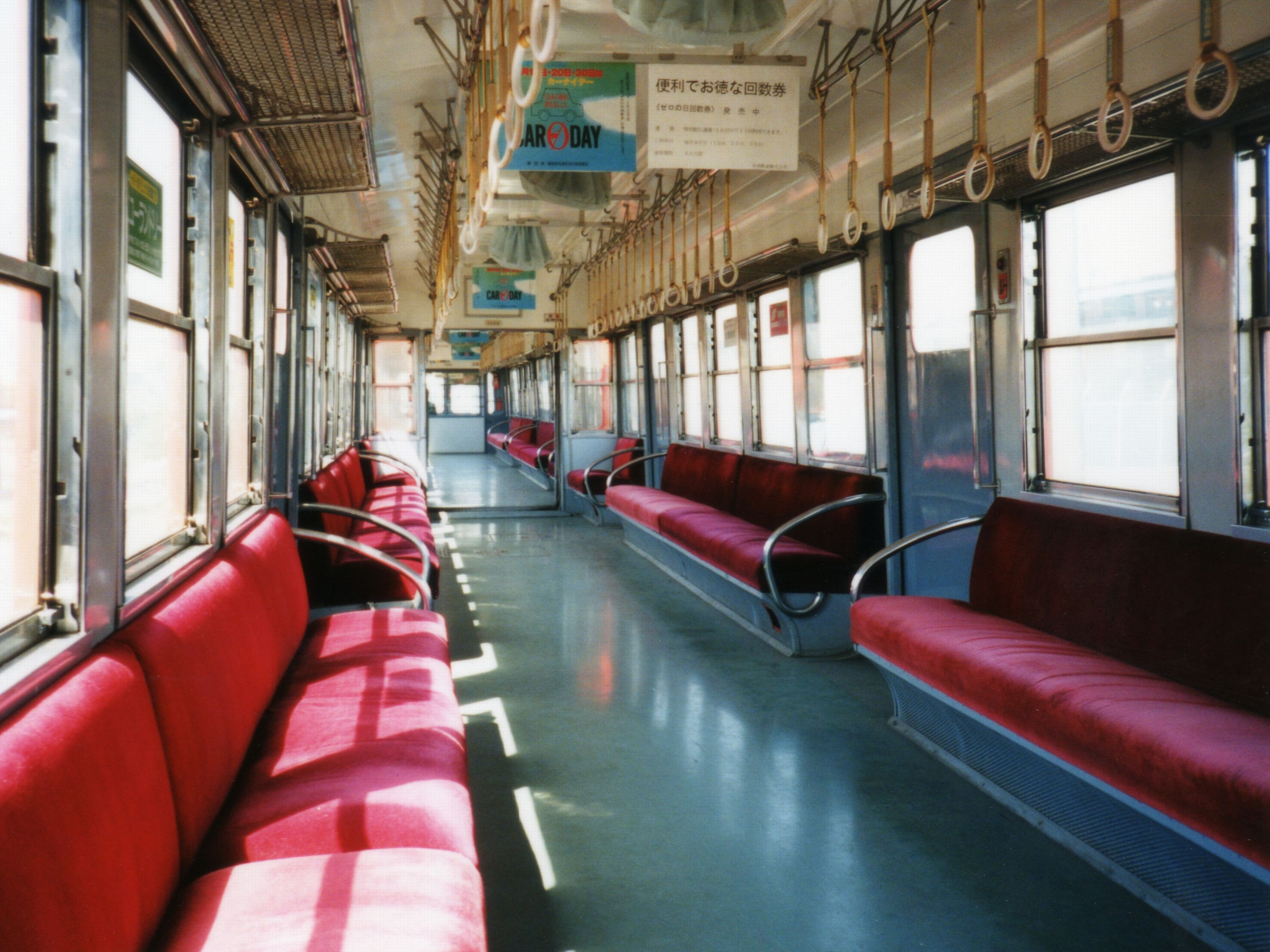
Interior view of a 5000 series operated by Gakunan Railway

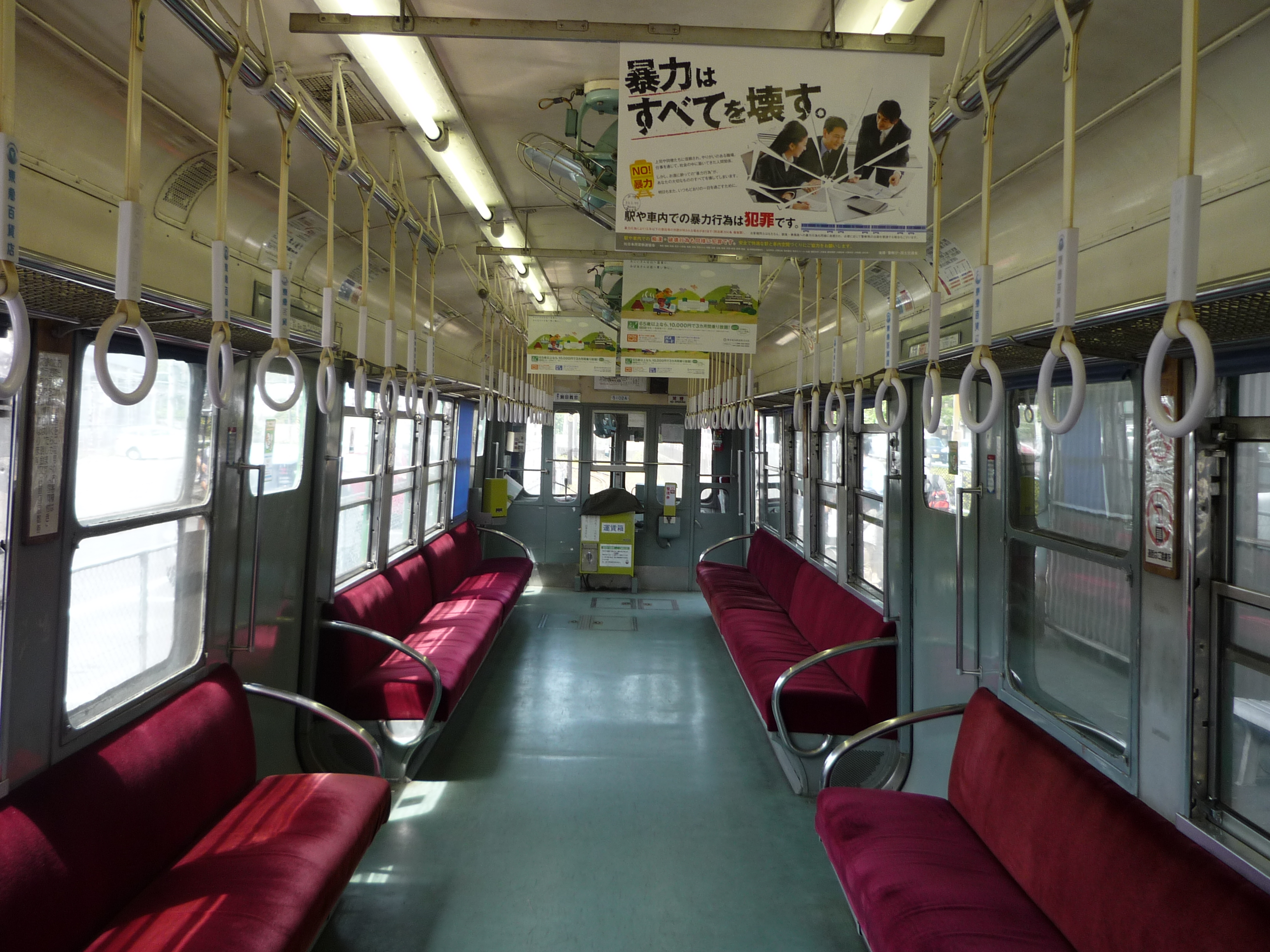
Interior view of Kumamoto Electric Railway 5102A

== History ==
The trains entered service on October 16, 1954. A total of 105 cars were built by Tokyu Car from 1954 to 1959. Toyoko Line services operated with 5000 series trains ended in March 1980.

The 5000 series was withdrawn from Meguro Line services in June 1986, and the trains were retired after a farewell run in July 1986.

New Tokyu 5000 series set 5122 received a green vinyl wrapping livery in September 2017, reminiscent of the original 5000 series' livery.

Certified to Mechanical Engineering Heritage (Japan) No. 128, in 2025.

== Other operators ==
About 70 former Tokyu 5000 series vehicles were transferred to other operators. Transfer of former 5000 series trains to Nagano Electric Railway began in 1977. They were also operated by Gakunan Railway, Ueda Electric Railway, Matsumoto Electric Railway, Fukushima Kotsu, and Kumamoto Electric Railway.

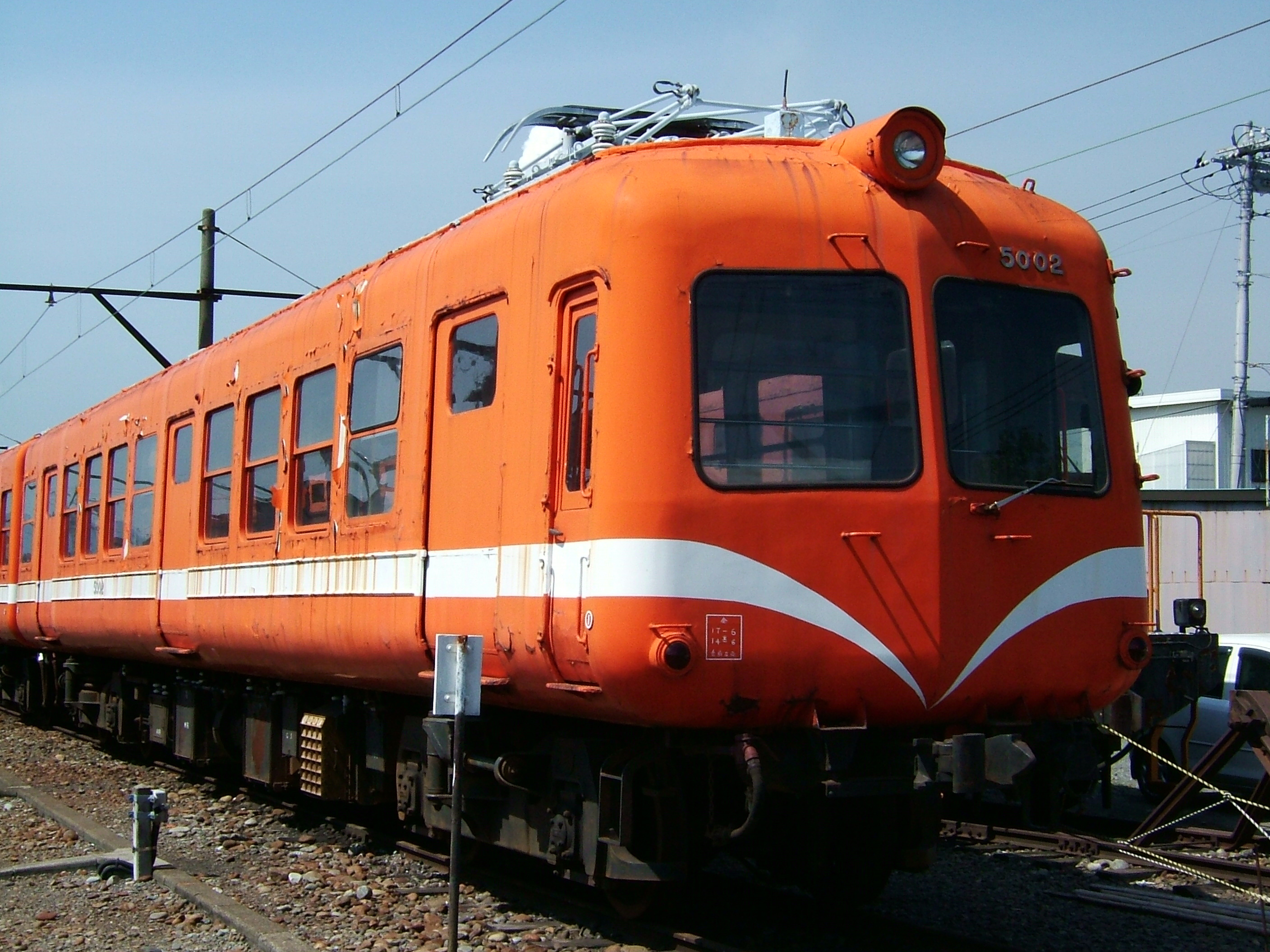
Gakunan 5000 series in September 2004

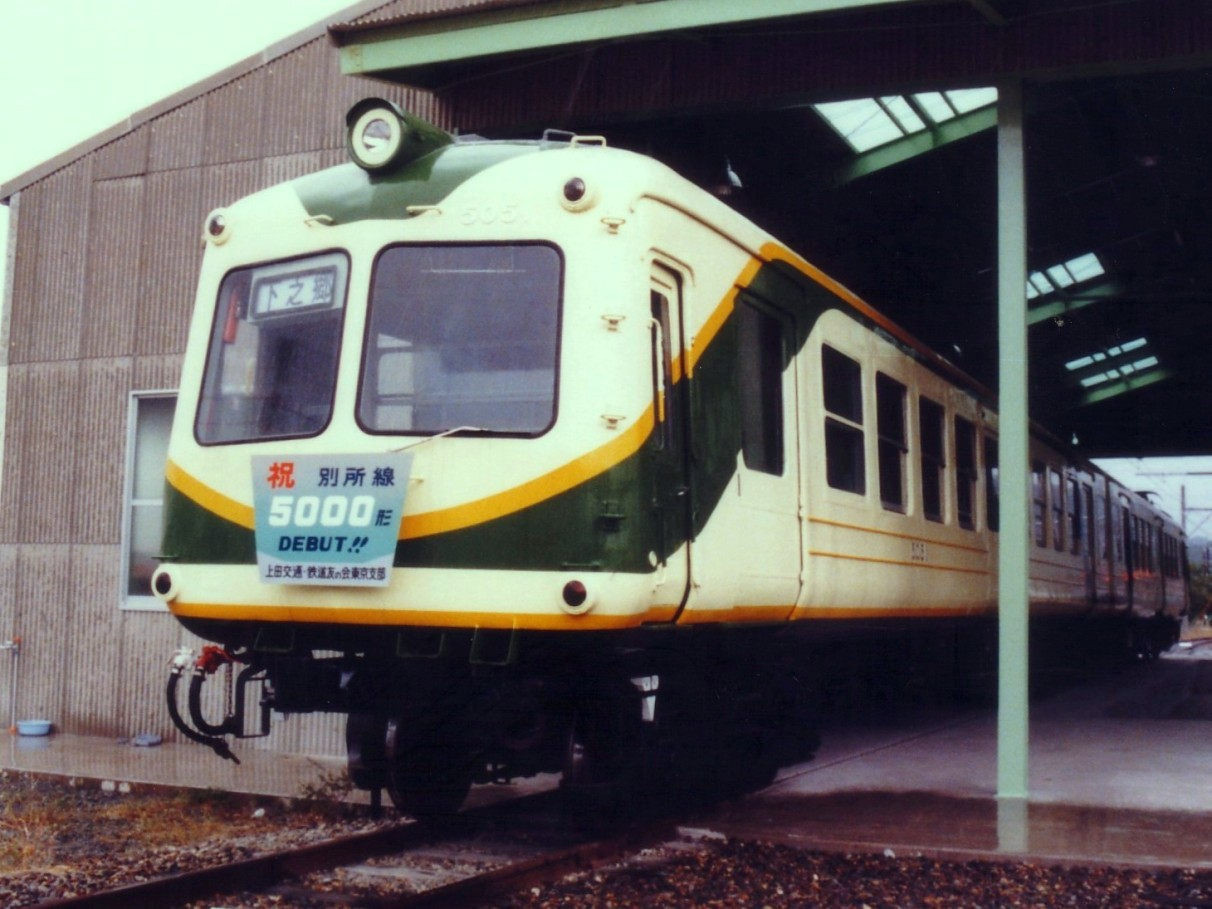
Ueda Kotsu 5000 series in September 1986

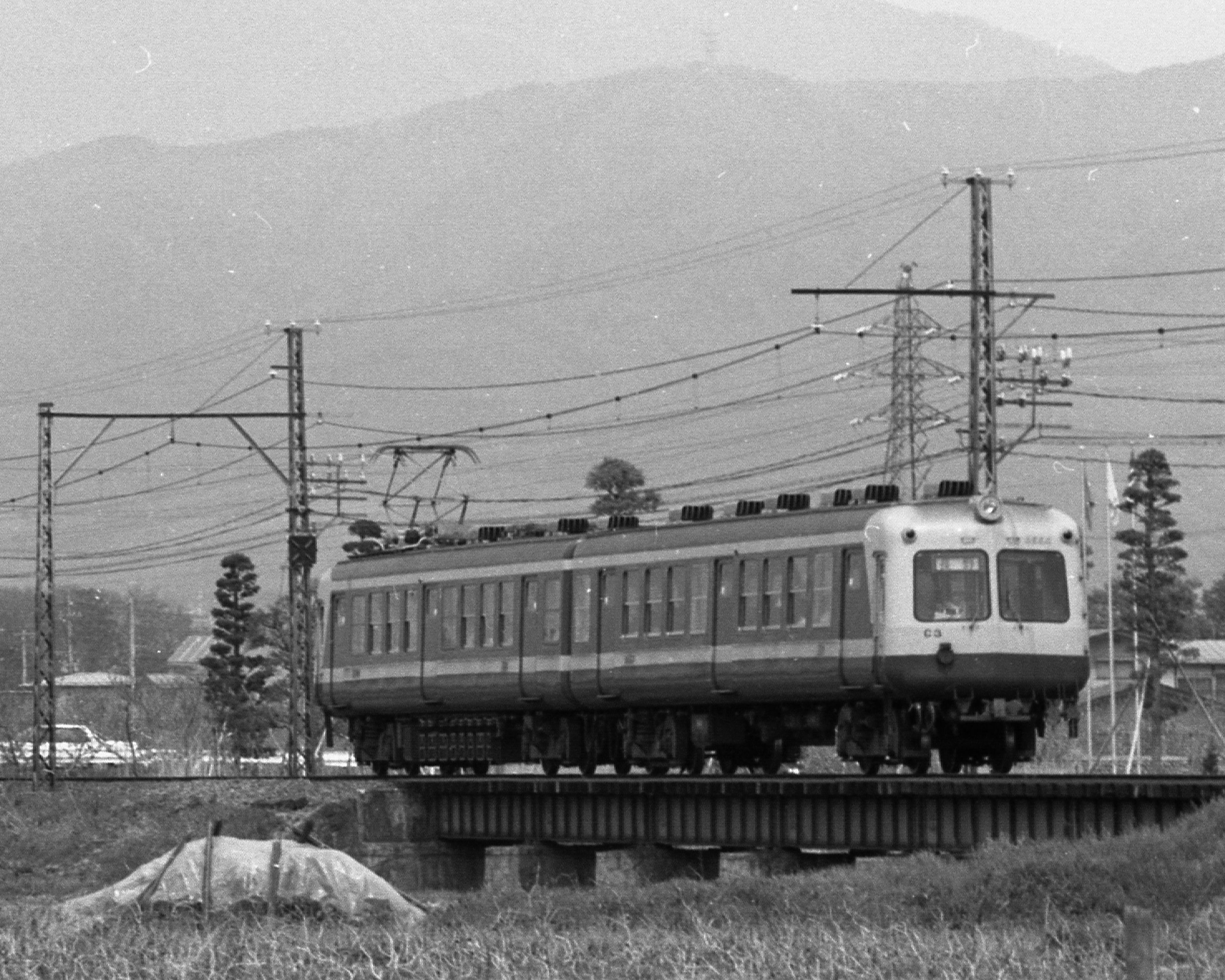
Nagaden 2500 series in May 1988

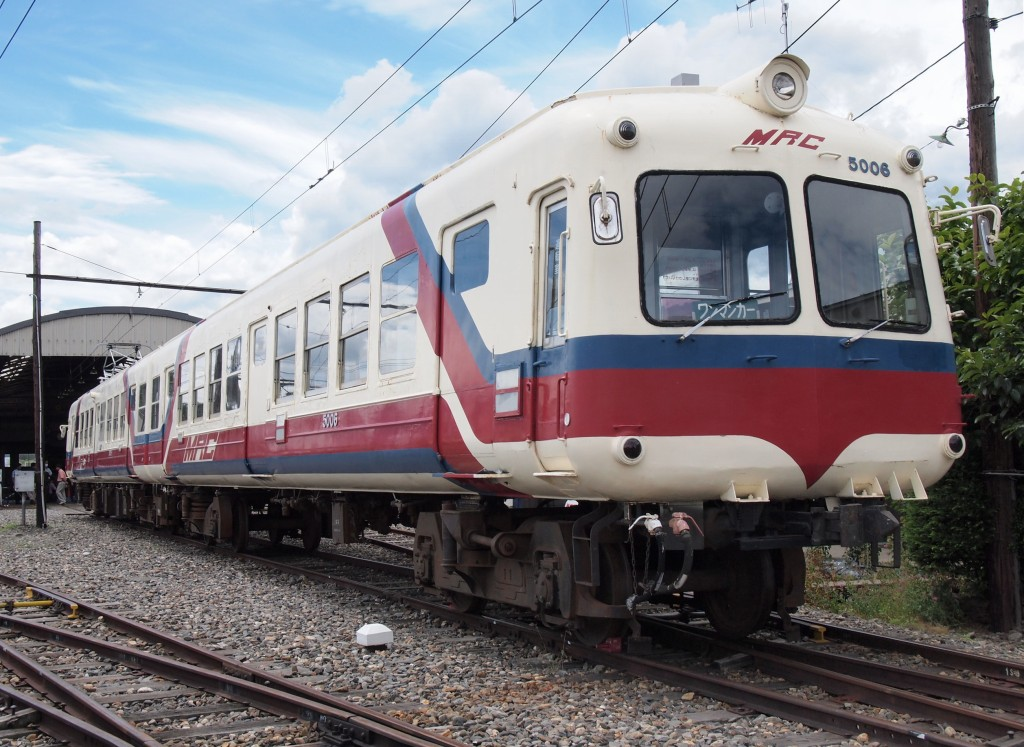
Matsuden 5000 series

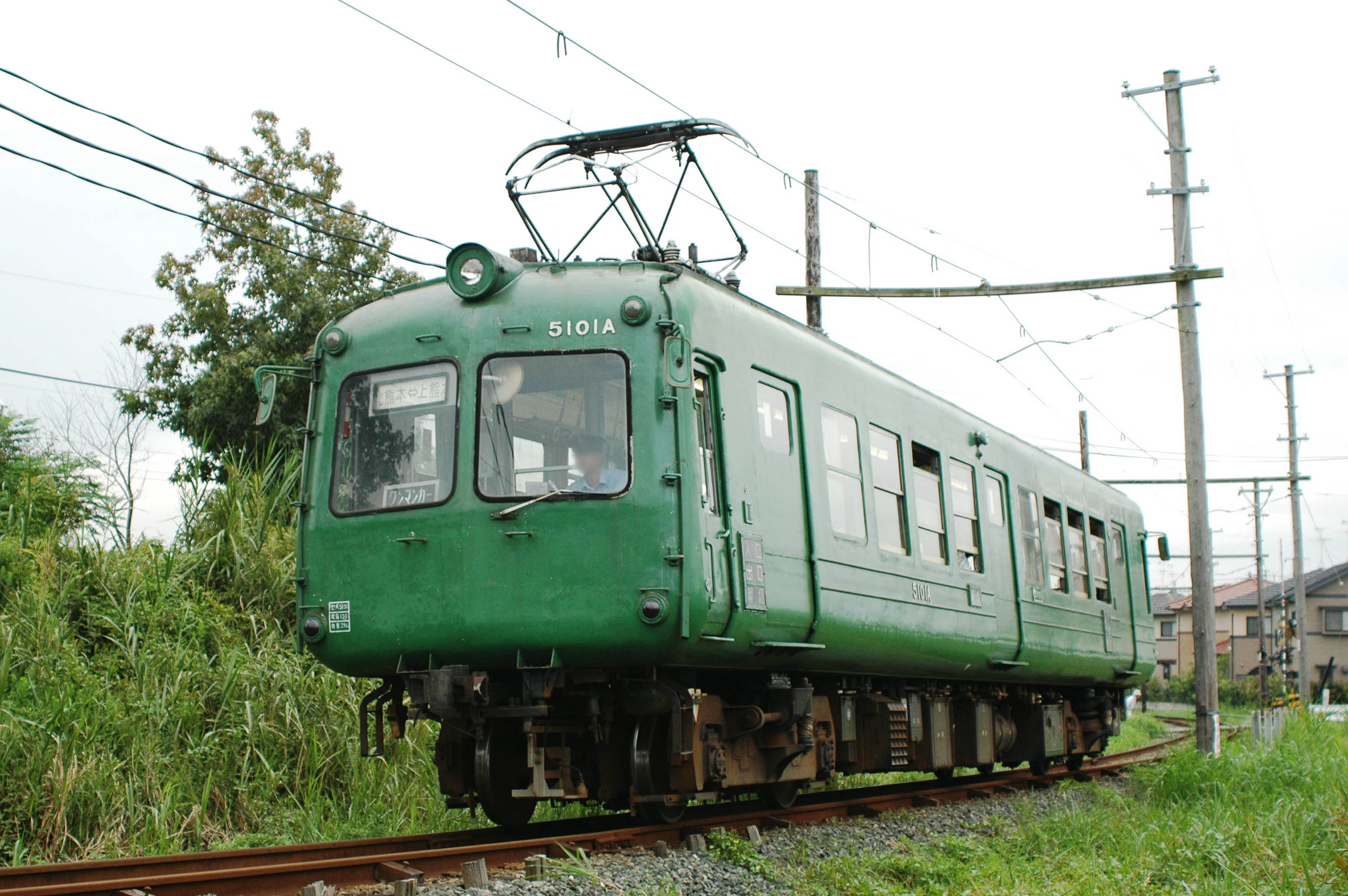
Kumamoto 5000 series in September 2006

== Preserved examples ==
- Deha 5001: was preserved in front of Shibuya Station, Tokyo, relocated to Odate, Akita in June 2020
- Matsumoto Electric Railway (Matsuden): one train stored, was repainted into its former Tokyu livery in 2012
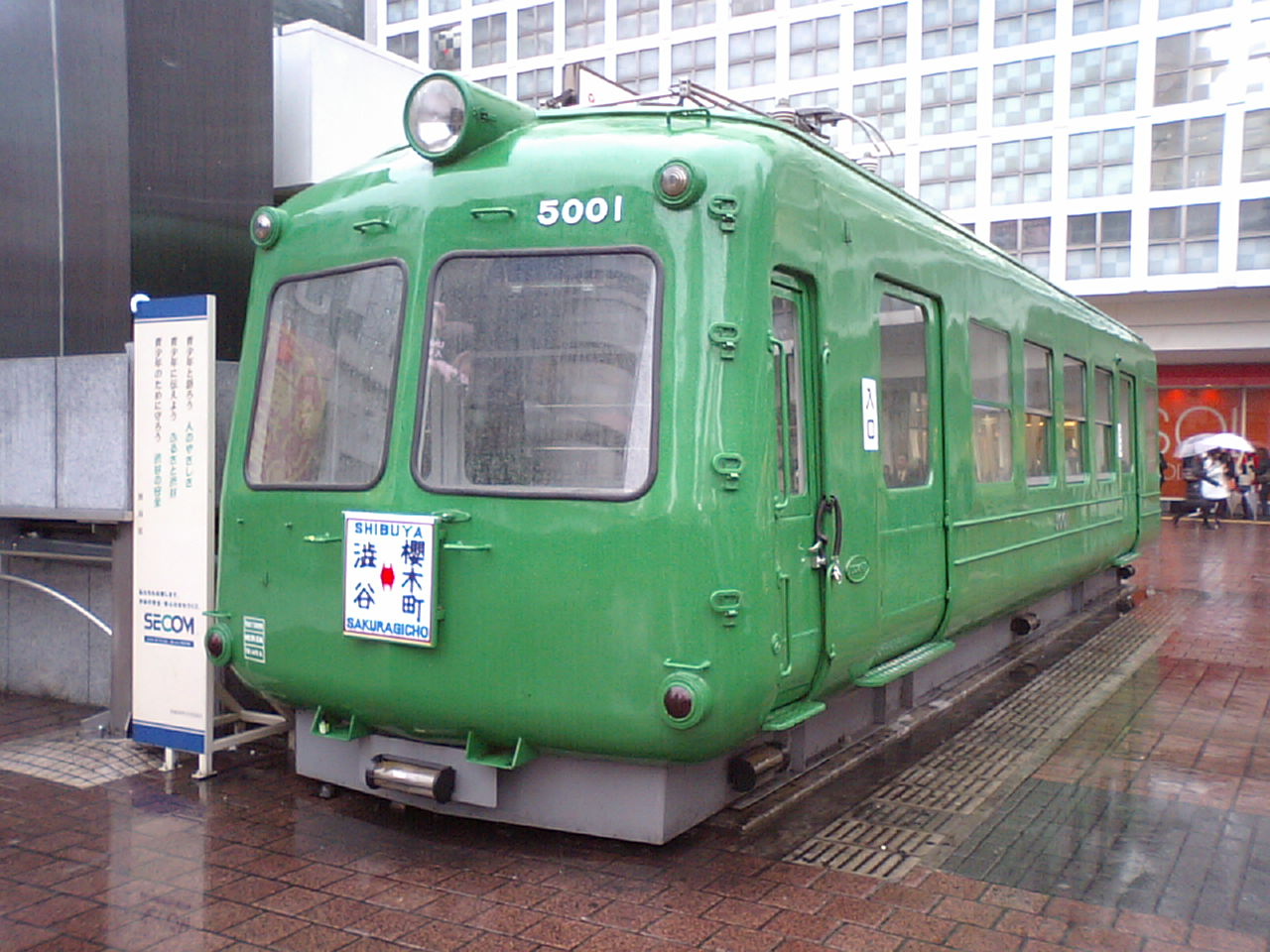
5001 in January 2008

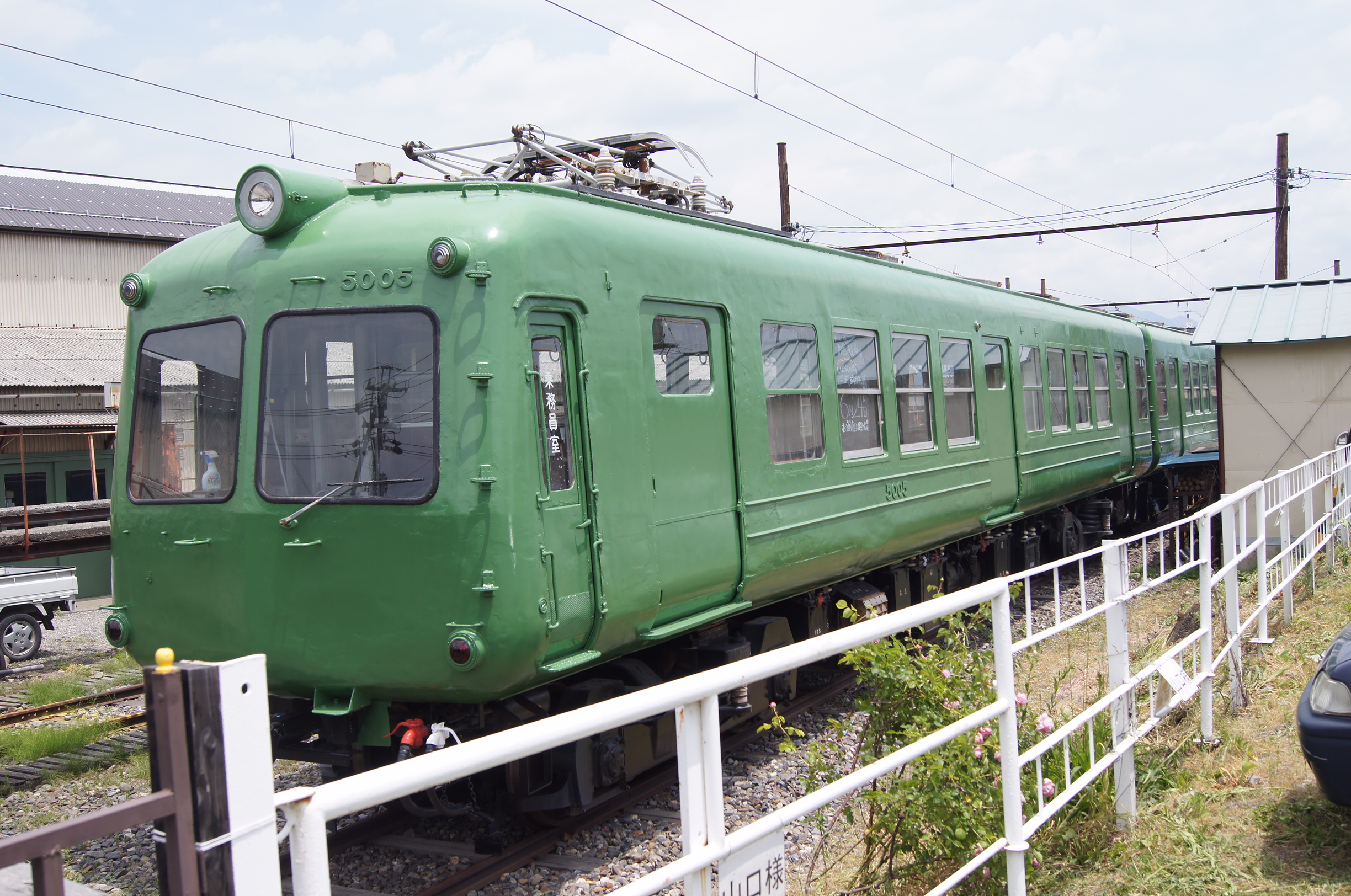
Matsuden train in June 2012

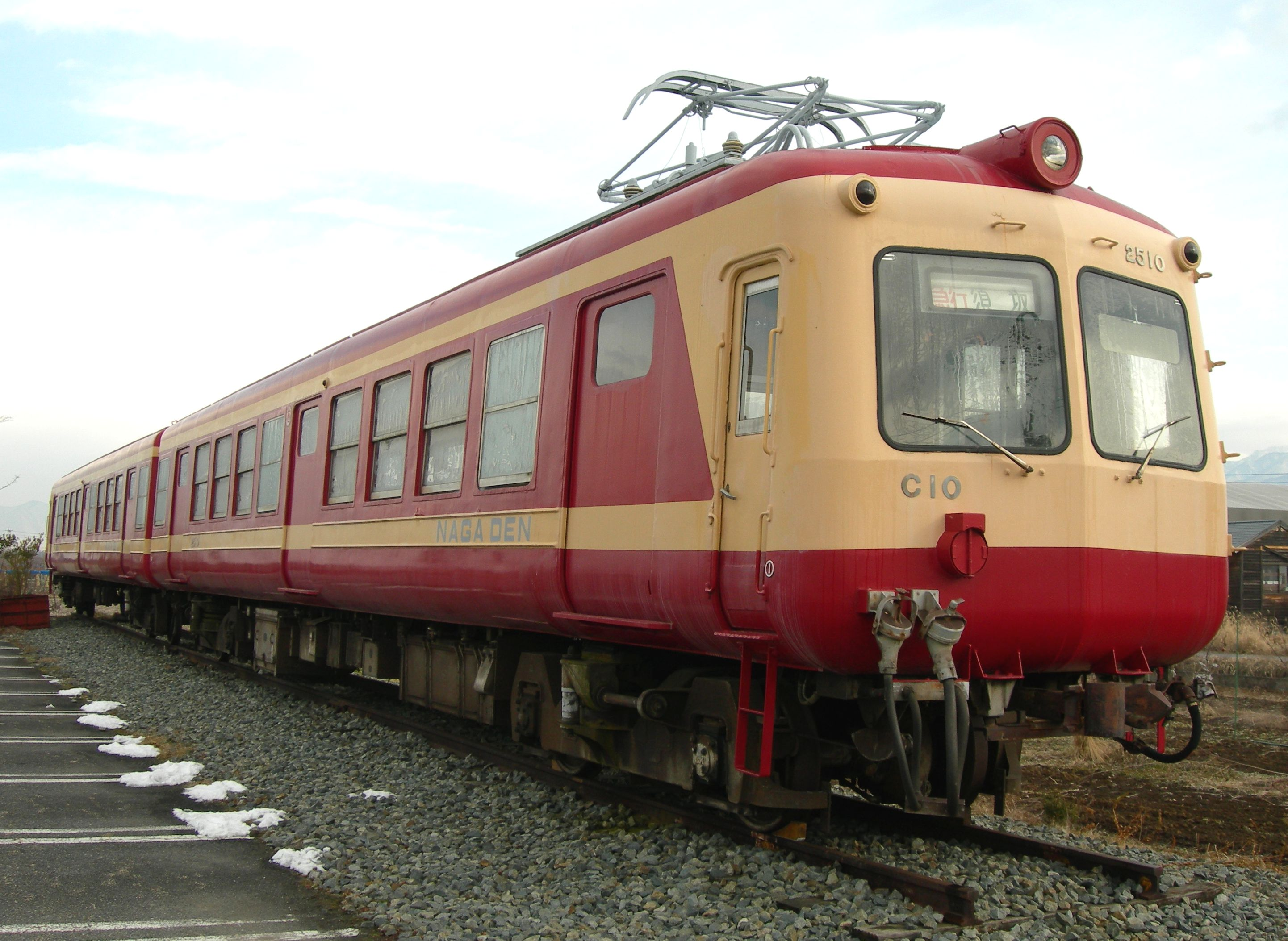
Nagaden 2500 series set C10 at the "Train Gallery Nagano" in Suzaka, Nagano Prefecture, January 2011
