= Tokyu 5200 series =

Japanese train type

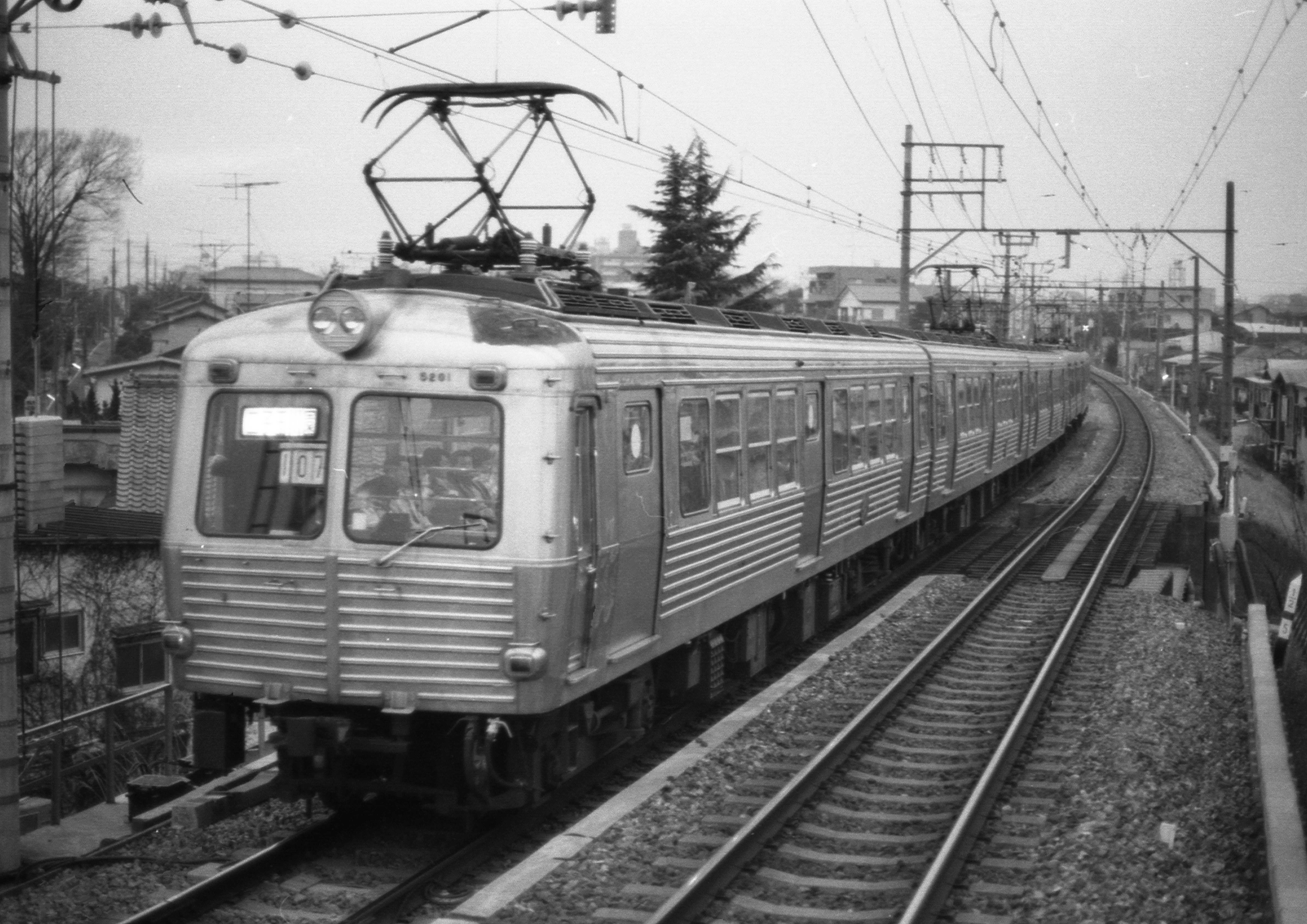
- A 5200 series train on the Oimachi Line in February 1985
- In service: 1958–1993
- Manufacturer: Tokyu Car
- Entered service: December 1, 1958
- Operators: Tokyu Corporation; Ueda Kotsu

Specifications
- Car body construction: Stainless steel
- Car length: 17,500 mm (57 ft 5 in)
- Doors: 3 per side
- Traction motors: SE-518
- Electric system(s): 1,500 V DC overhead lines
- Current collector(s): Pantograph
- Bogies: TS-301
- Track gauge: 1,067 mm (3 ft 6 in)

The Tokyu 5200 series (東急5200系, Tōkyū 5200-kei) was an electric multiple unit (EMU) train type operated by the private railway operator Tokyu Corporation in Japan from 1958, and later by Ueda Kotsu until 1993.

== Technical specifications ==
The outer structure of the car bodies was made of stainless steel. The trains are equipped with Toshiba SE-518 motors with a power output of 100kW, and TS-301 bogies.

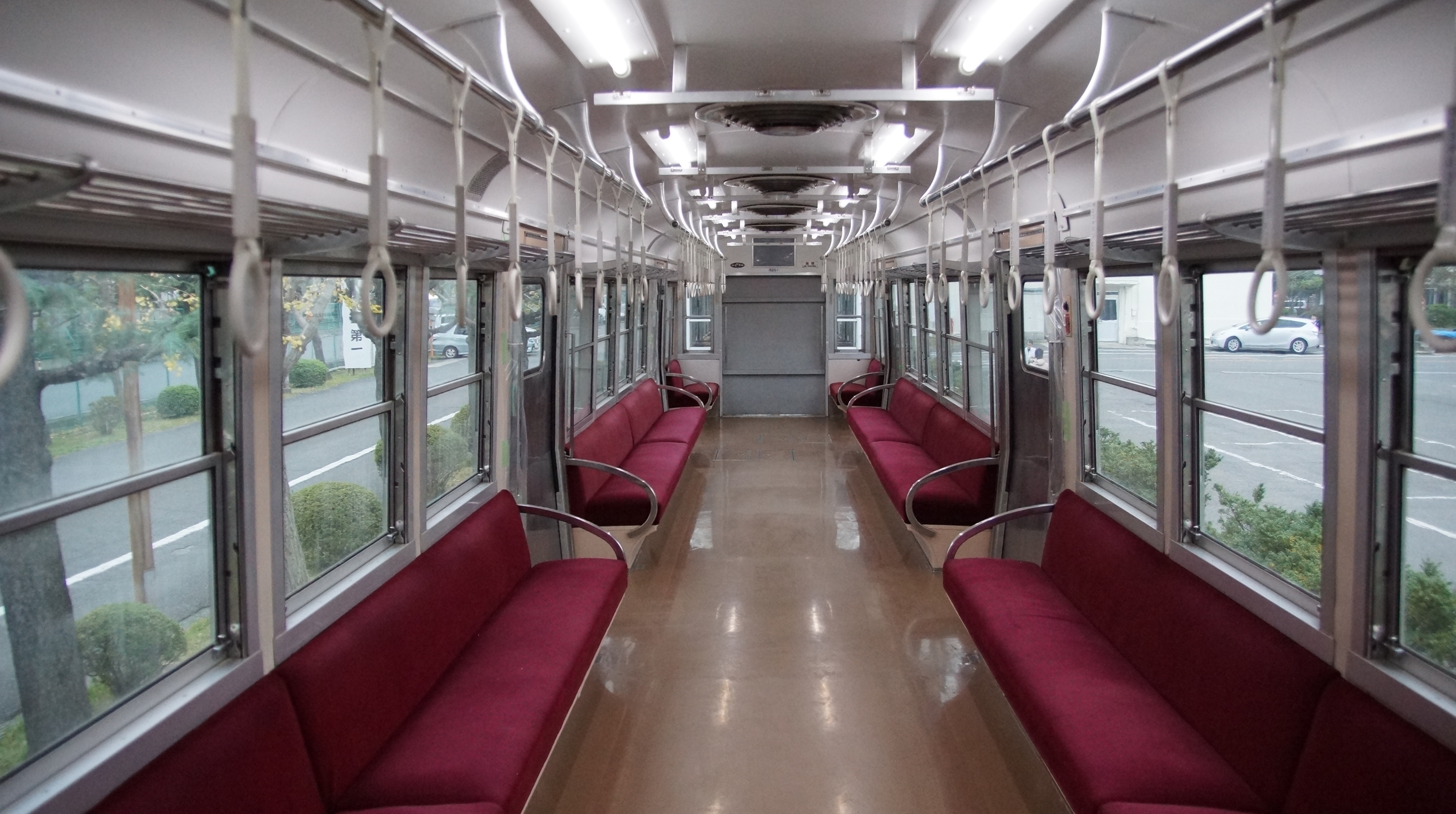
Interior of car 5201

== History ==
The trains entered service on December 1, 1958, initially running on the Tōyoko Line, and were subsequently also used on the Den-en-toshi and Ōimachi lines.

=== Ueda Electric Railway ===
In 1986, former Tokyu 5200 series cars were transferred to Ueda Kotsu, where they stayed in service until 1993.

== Preserved examples ==
- Deha 5201: preserved at the J-TREC factory in Yokohama, Japan
- Car 5251: preserved by Ueda Electric Railway
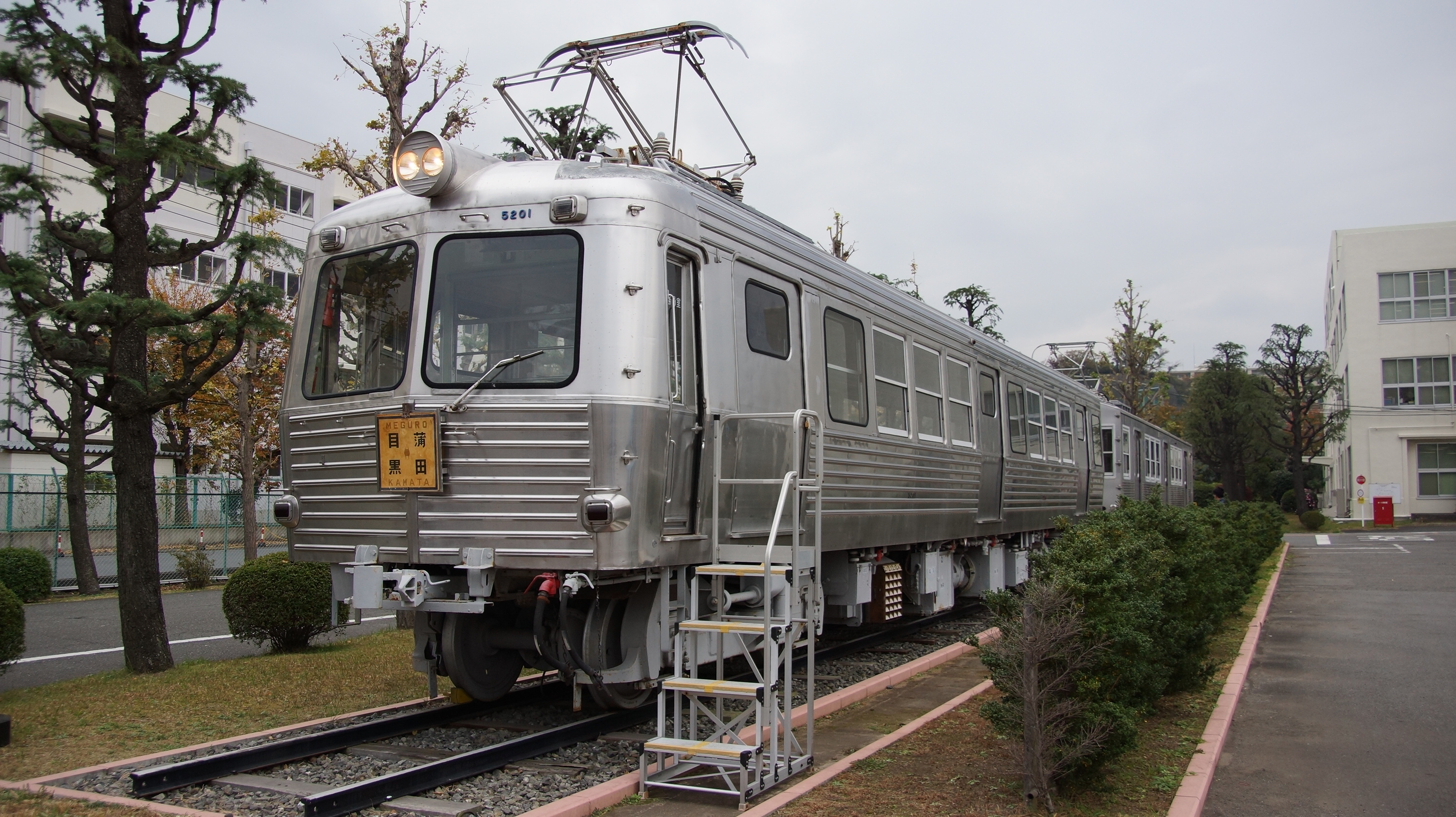
Deha 5201 at the J-TREC factory in Yokohama in November 2013

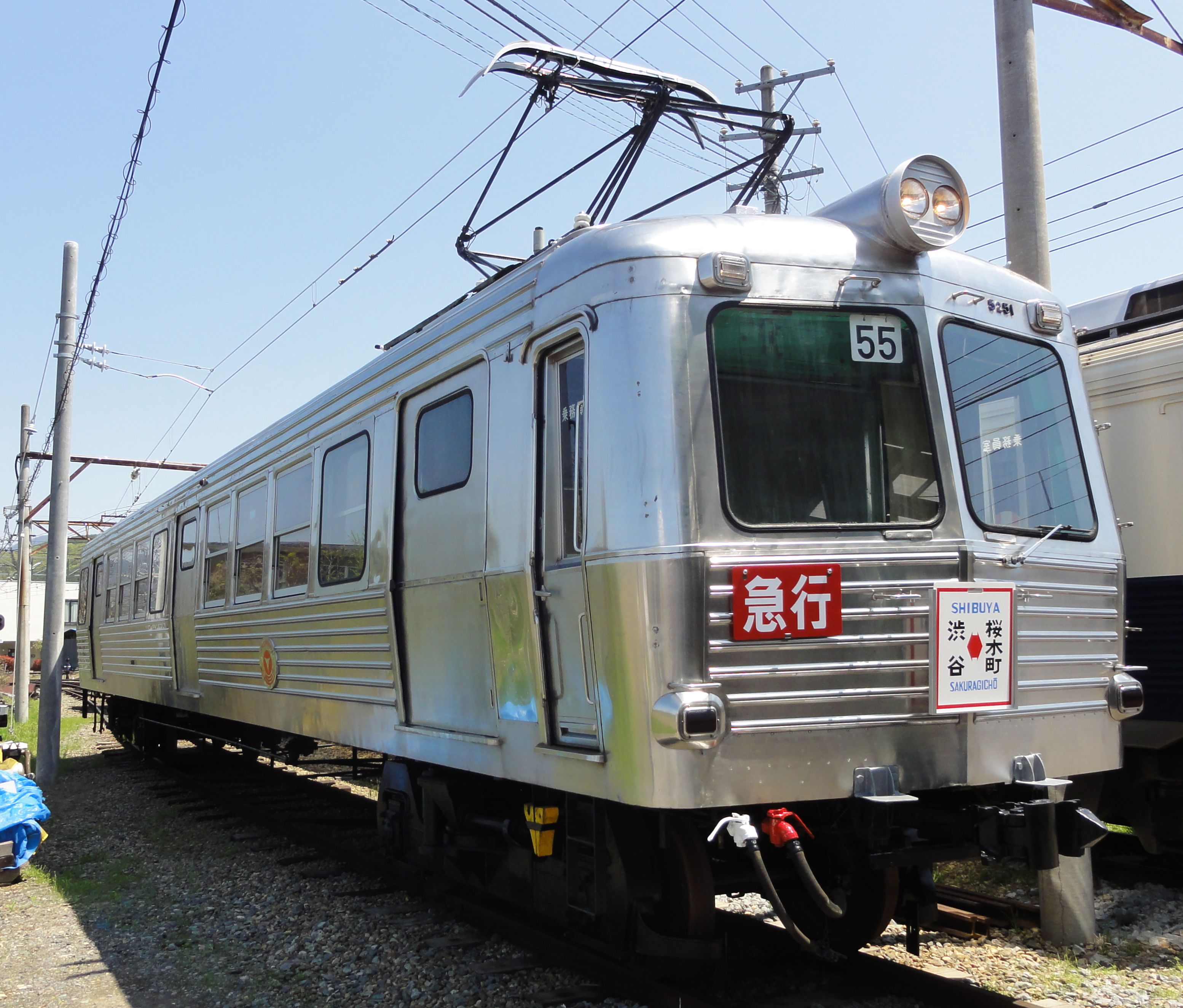
5251 in May 2012
