= 700 series =

700 series may refer to:

- 700 Series Shinkansen, Japanese high-speed train
- N700 Series Shinkansen, Japanese high-speed train
- Choshi Electric Railway 700 series electric multiple unit
- GeForce 700 series of graphics processing units from Nvidia
- Iyotetsu 700 series electric multiple unit
- Keihan 700 series electric multiple unit
- Keikyu 700 series (1956), electric trains operated by Keikyu in Japan from 1956, and later reclassified 600 series
- Keikyu 700 series, electric trains operated by Keikyu in Japan from 1967 to 2005
- IBM 700 series, vacuum tube digital computers in the 1950s
- IdeaPad 700, a discontinued brand of notebook computers, same as Lenovo's IdeaPad 100
- ThinkPad 700 series, a line of laptop computers

== See also ==
- Series 7 (disambiguation)
- 7000 series (disambiguation)

Preceded by Series 601-699 (disambiguation)	700 series	Succeeded by Series 701-799 (disambiguation)
Preceded by 600 series (disambiguation)	700 series	Succeeded by 800 series (disambiguation)
