= Choshi Electric Railway 2000 series =

Japanese train type

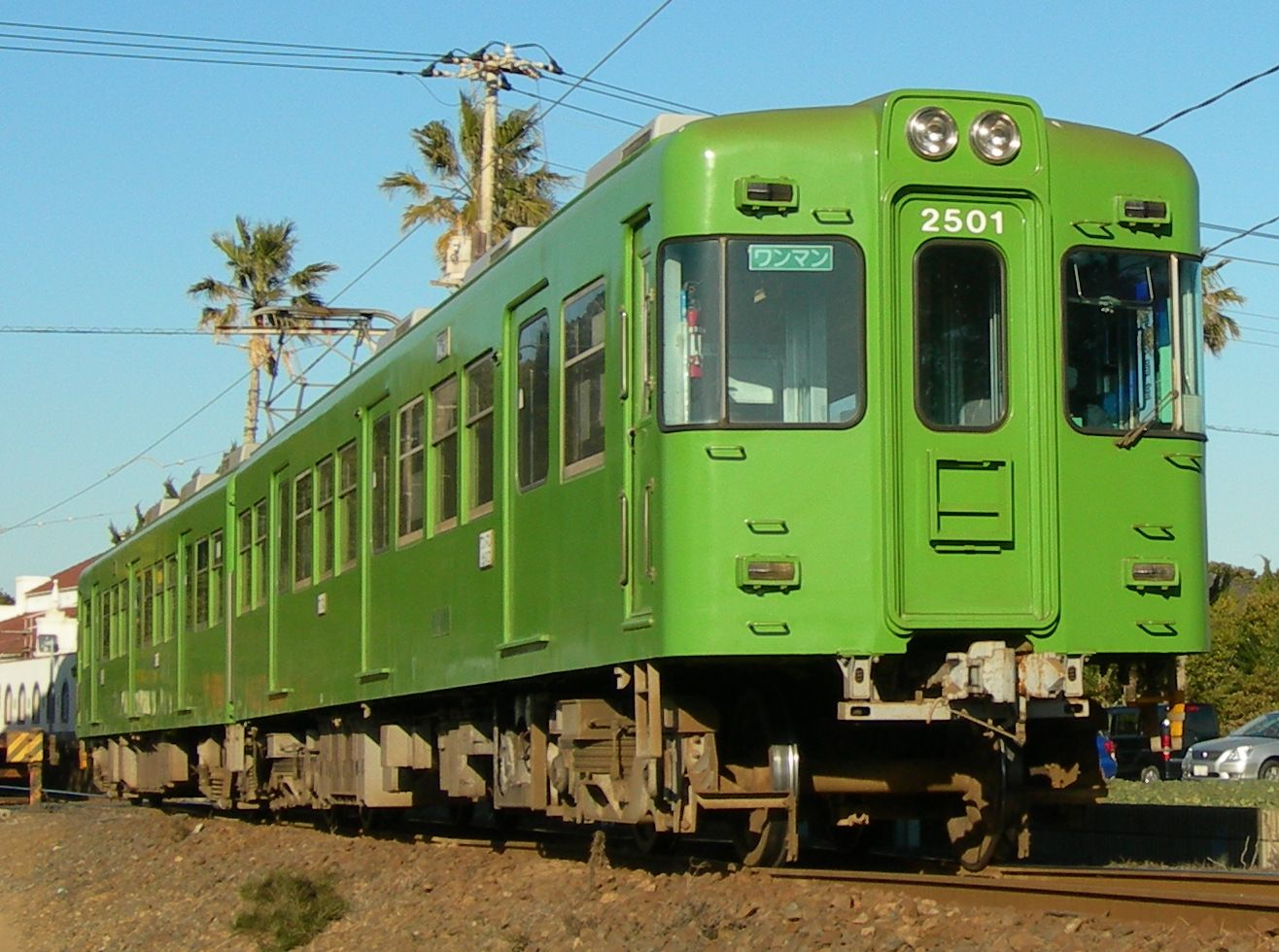
- 2000 series set 2001 near Inuboh Station in January 2011
- Manufacturer: Hitachi, Nippon Sharyo
- Replaced: 700/800 series
- Constructed: 1962
- Entered service: 24 July 2010
- Refurbished: 2010
- Number in service: 4 vehicles (2 sets)
- Formation: 2 cars per trainset
- Capacity: 238 (98 seated)
- Operators: Choshi Electric Railway
- Depots: Nakanochō

Specifications
- Car body construction: Steel
- Car length: 17,680 mm (58 ft 0 in)
- Width: 2,700 mm (8 ft 10 in)
- Height: 4,100 mm (13 ft 5 in)
- Doors: 3 sliding doors per side
- Traction system: 90 kW x4
- Power output: 360 kW
- Electric system(s): 600 V DC
- Current collection: Overhead wire
- Track gauge: 1,067 mm (3 ft 6 in)

The Choshi Electric Railway 2000 series (銚子電鉄2000形, Chōshi Dentetsu 2000-gata) is an electric multiple unit (EMU) train type operated by the private railway operator Choshi Electric Railway in Chiba Prefecture, Japan, since July 2010. The two two-car sets were converted from former Iyo Railway 800 series EMU cars, which were themselves converted from former Keio Corporation 2010 series EMUs built in 1962, and were introduced to replace the Choshi Electric Railway's ageing 700 and 800 series EMU cars.

== Formations ==
The two two-car sets are each formed of a driving motor (Mc) car and driving trailer (Tc) car as shown below, with the DeHa 2000 cars at the Chōshi end.

Designation	Mc	Tc
Numbering	DeHa 200x	KuHa 250x
Capacity (total/seated)	118/48	120/50
Weight (t)	32.7	26.7

The DeHa 2000 cars were originally fitted with one lozenge type pantograph. The pantograph on DeHa 2001 was damaged on 20 October 2013, entailing its replacement with a spare single-arm pantograph from 22 October – a first for trains on the line.

== External livery ==
=== Set 2001 ===
Set 2001 initially carried the all-over green livery originally carried in its Keio days. Following general overhaul in December 2017, car KuHa 2501 was repainted into a new livery of dark blue and light grey, with car DeHa 2001 remaining in the same all-over green livery it carried from its introduction on the Choshi Electric Railway.

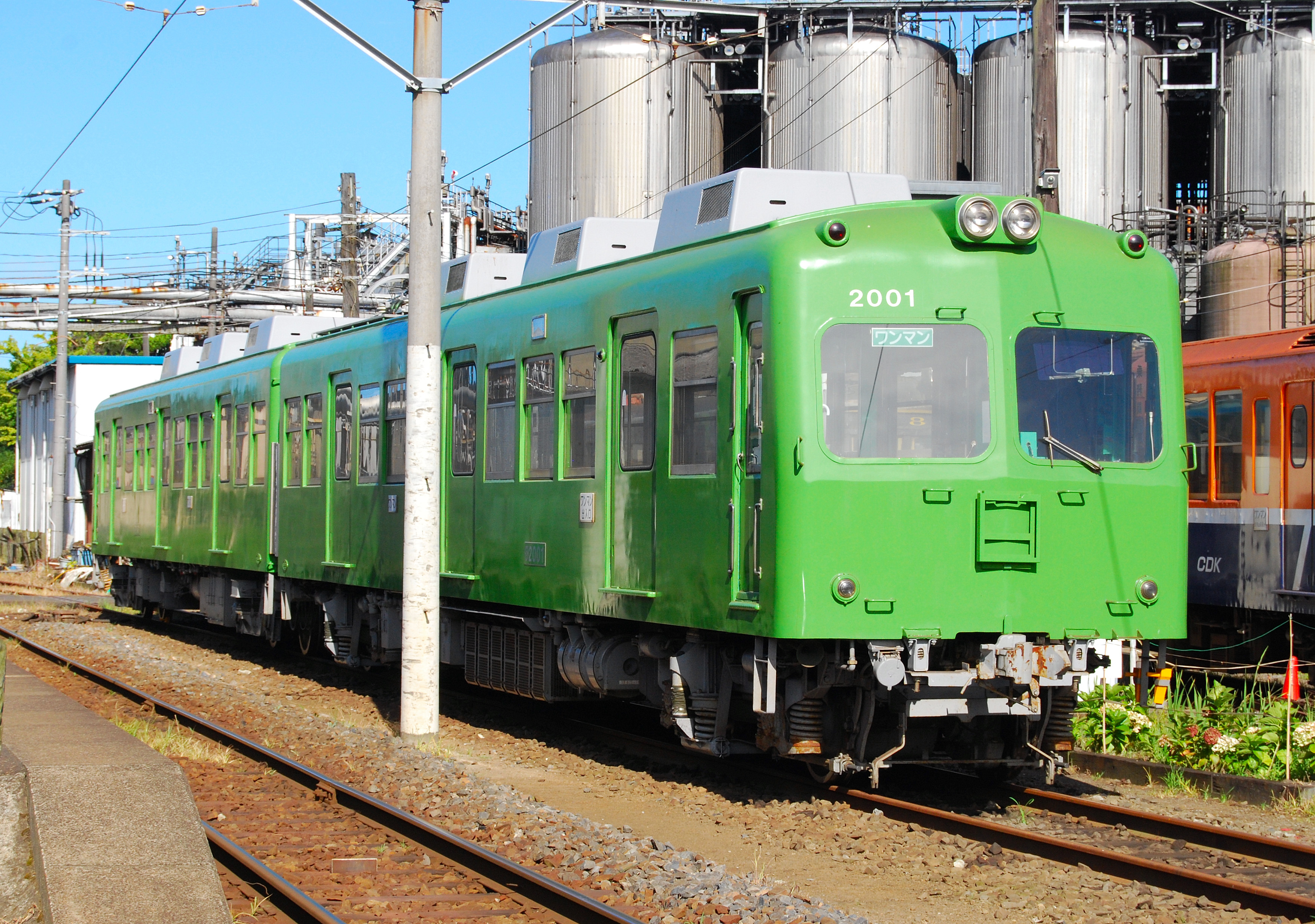
Set 2001 in all-over green Keio-style livery in August 2010

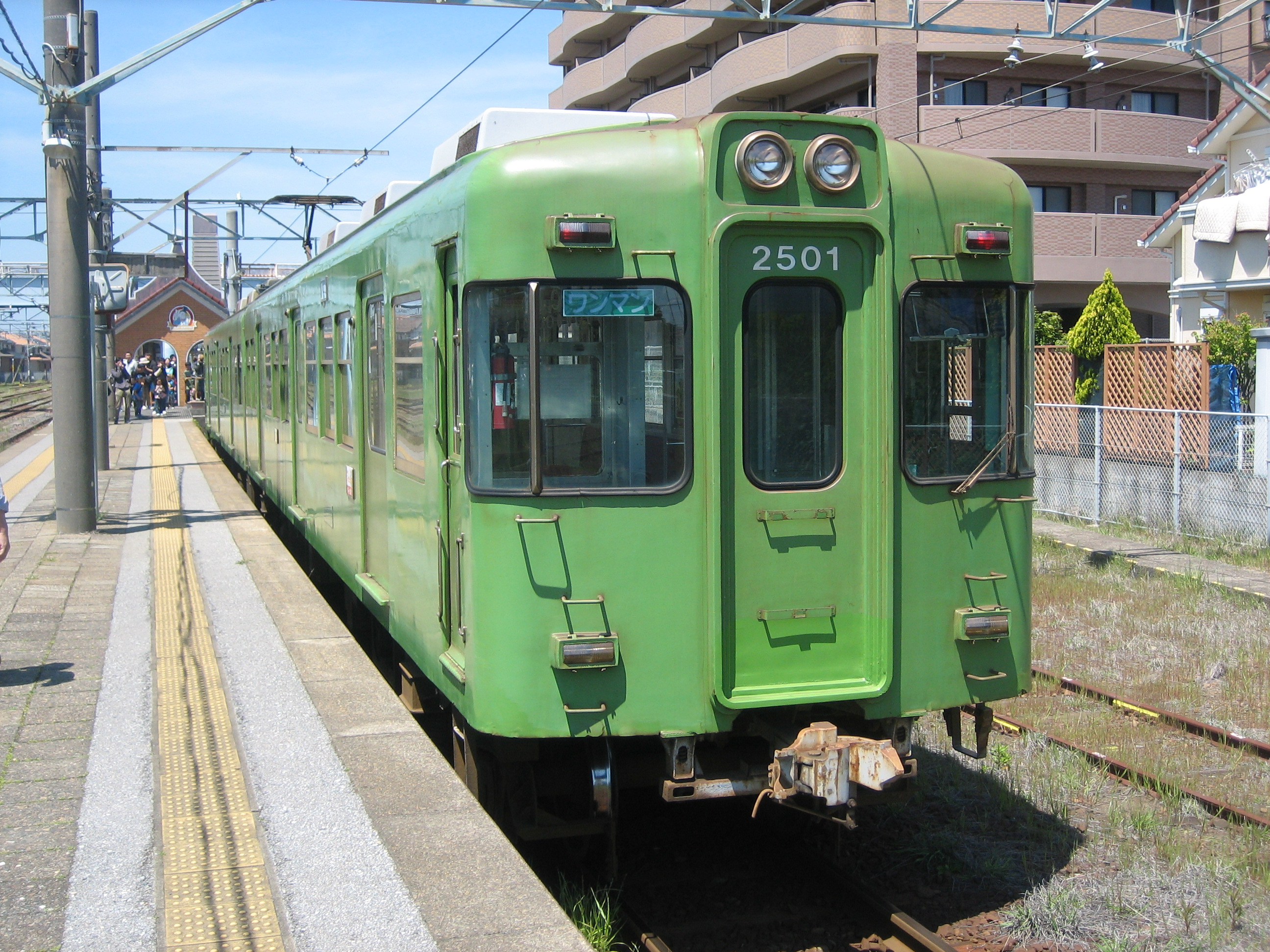
Set 2001 in May 2014, with its replacement single-arm pantograph

=== Set 2002 ===
Set 2002 was initially painted into all-over cream livery and entered service in July 2010 with advertising vinyls promoting the local Aeon shopping mall. The advertising contract with Aeon for set 2002 expired on 21 November 2012, and from December, the set was returned to service in the cream livery with red bodyside line as carried by the Keio 2010 series EMUs in their later days. Set 2002 was scheduled to run in this livery until 16 September 2013, after which date it received a "90th Anniversary livery", consisting of the addition of black and red paintwork to the non-gangwayed cab end. Following the completion of accident damage repairs in March 2015, set 2002 was repainted in the early Choshi Electric Railway livery of red and beige, returning to service in April 2015.

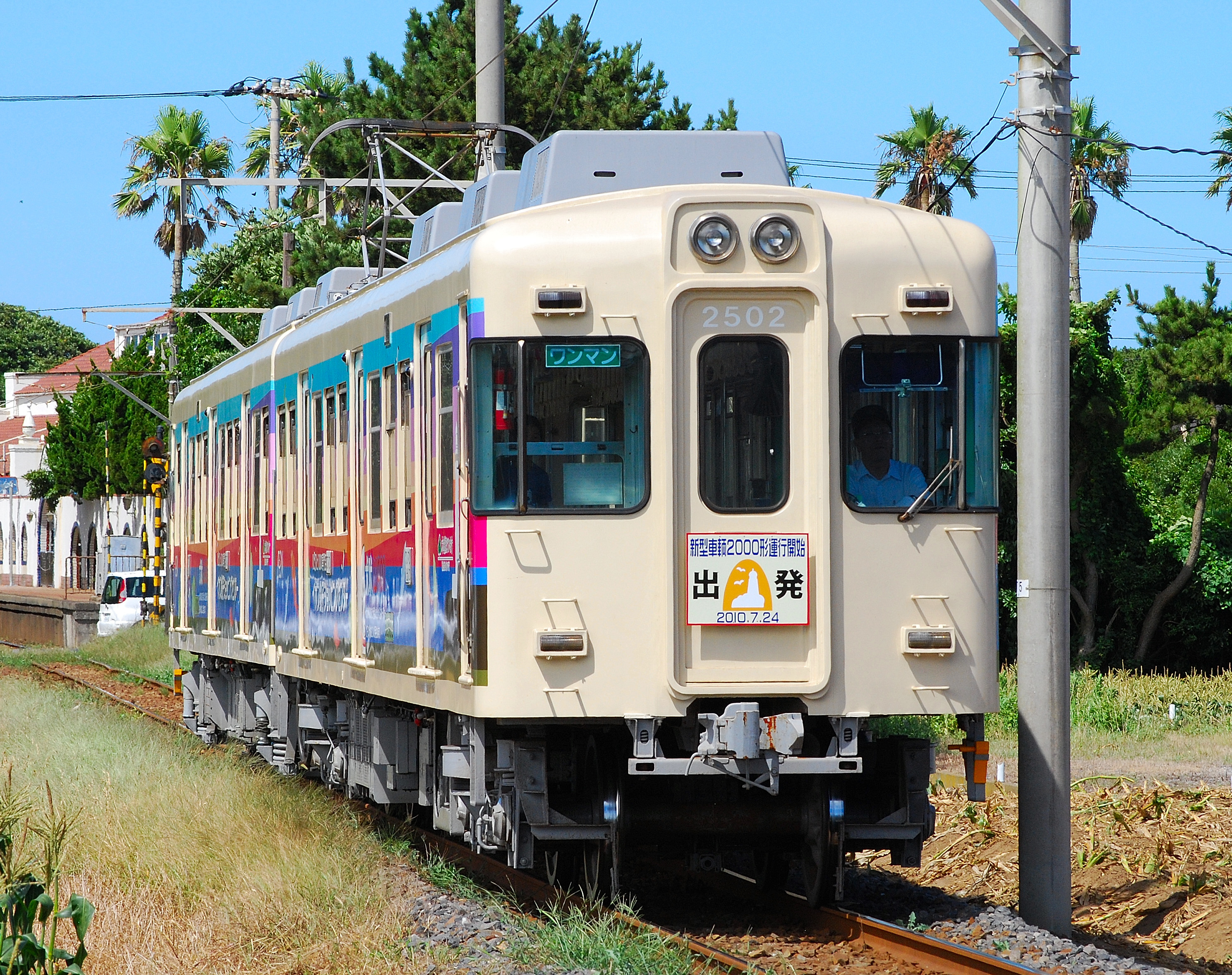
Set 2002 in August 2010 in Aeon advertising livery with KuHa 2502 leading

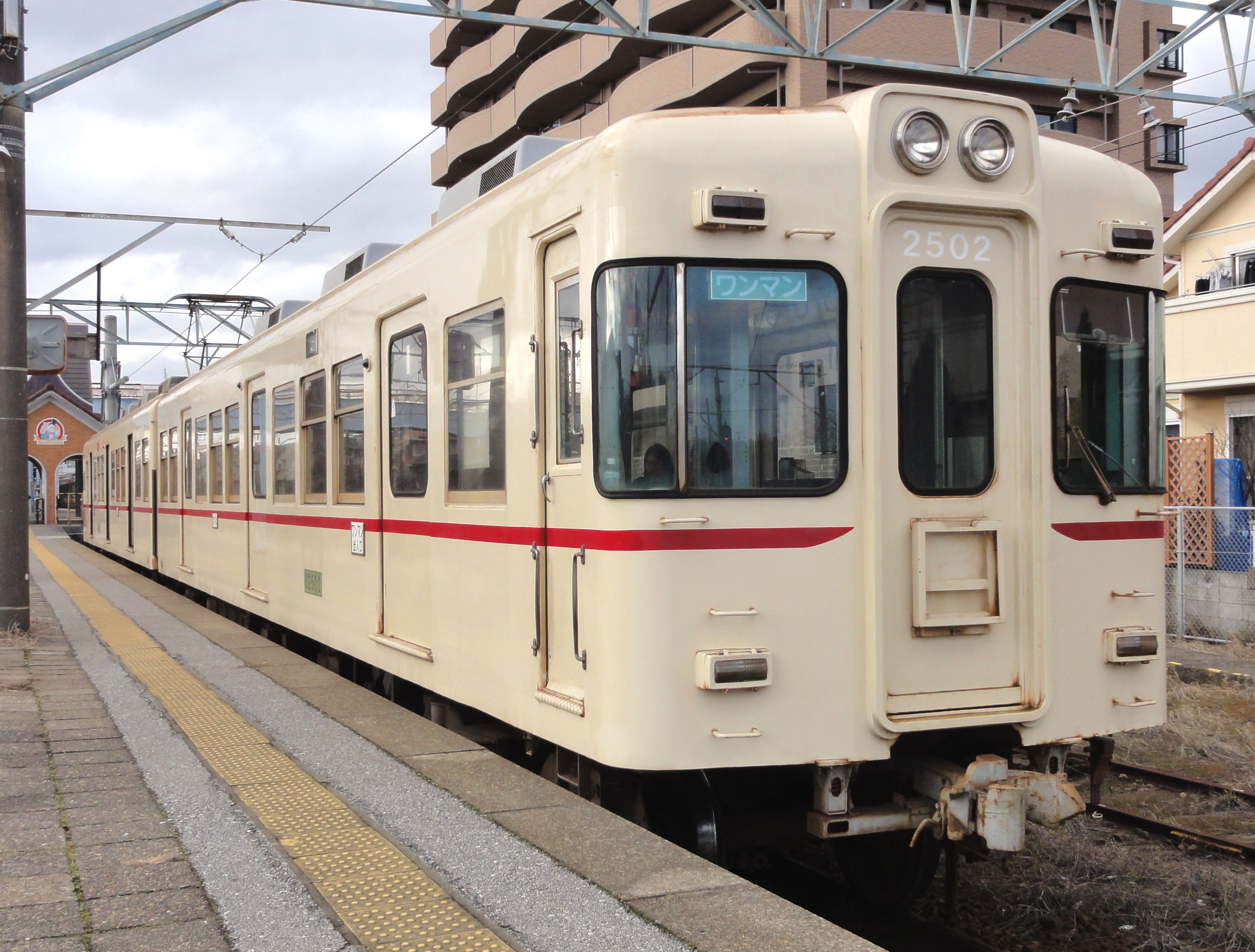
Set 2002 in Keio-style livery in December 2012, following removal of its earlier advertising vinyls

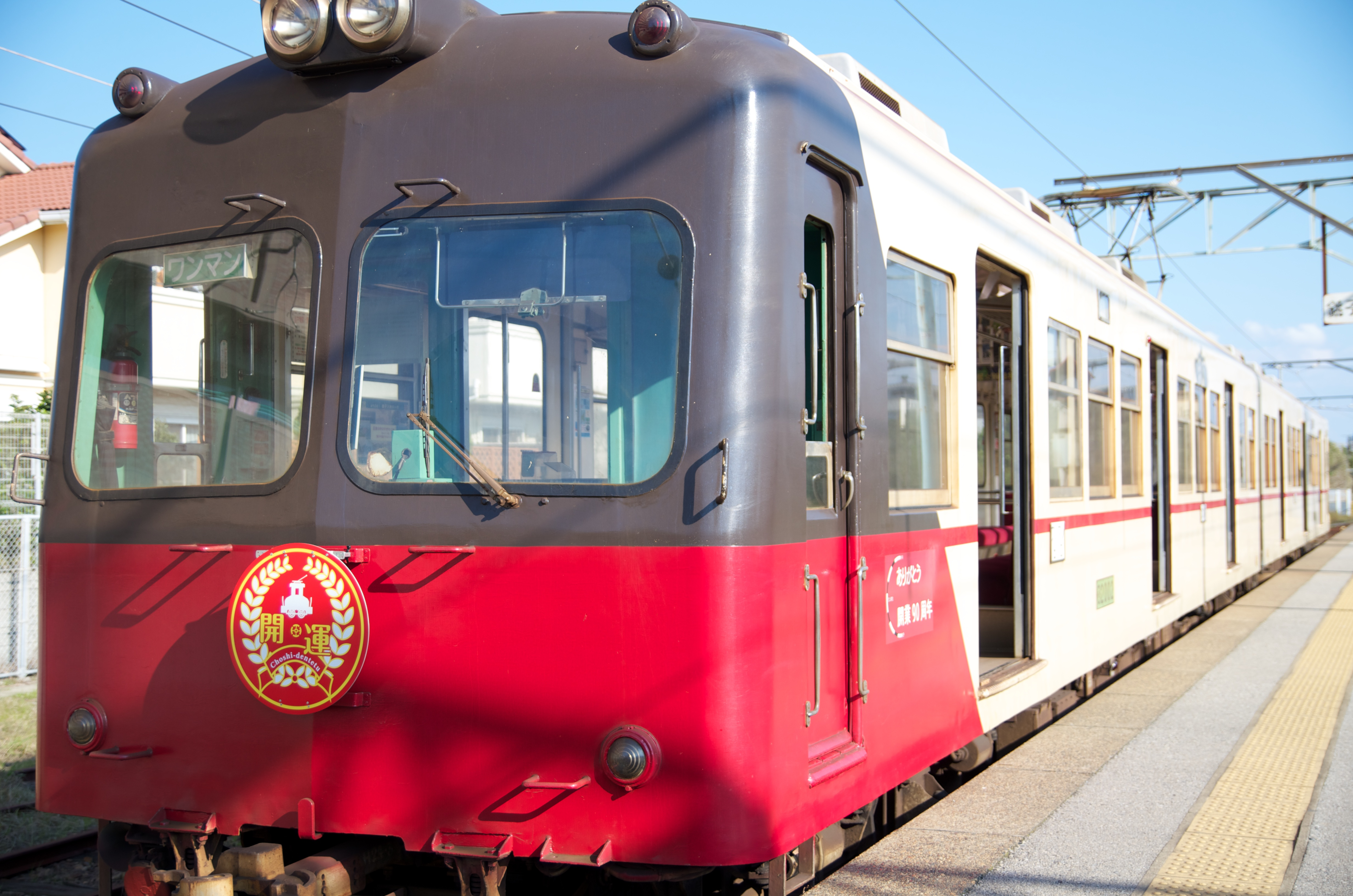
Set 2002 in "90th Anniversary livery" in November 2013

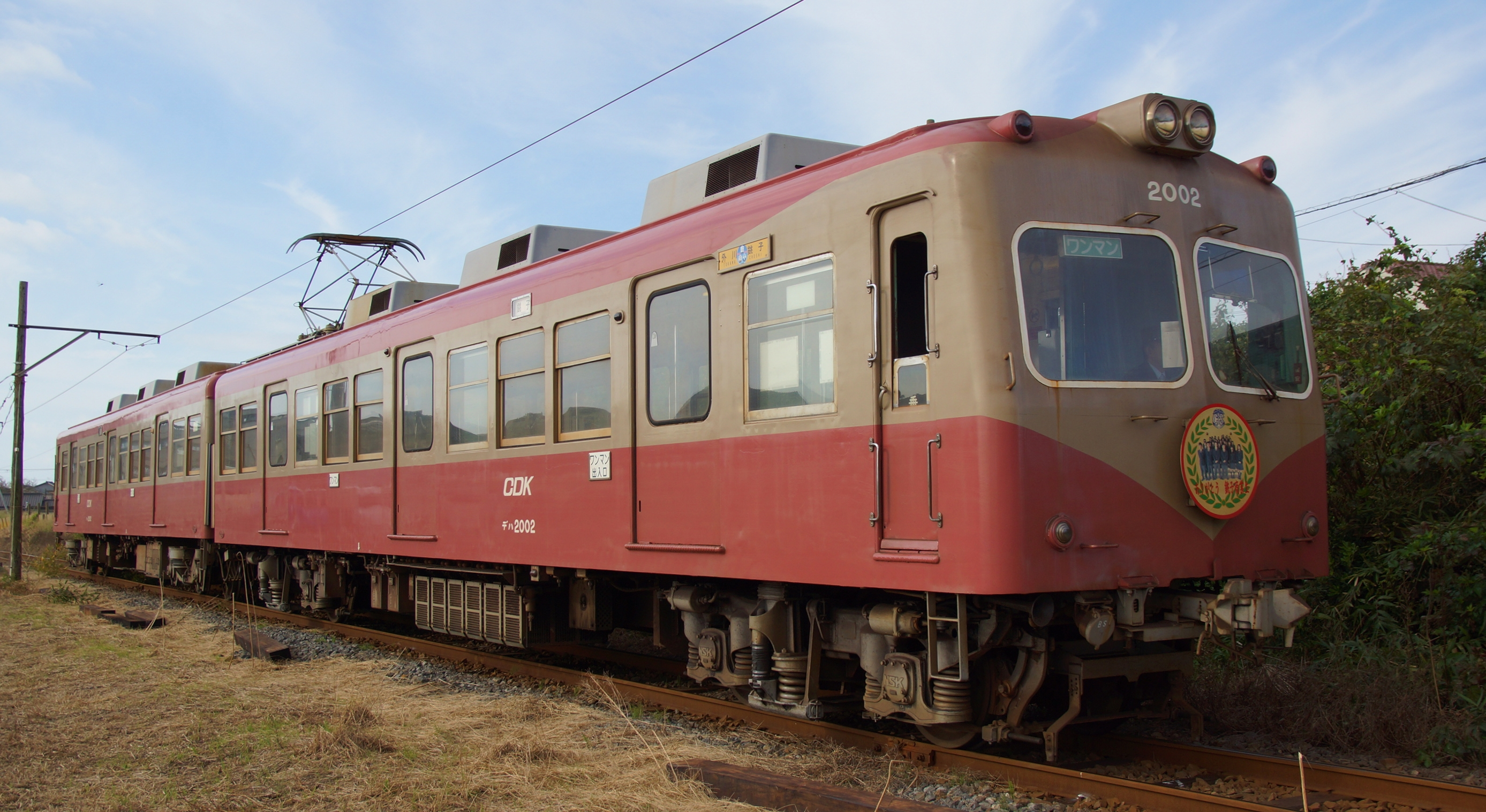
Set 2002 in old-style livery in October 2015

== Interior ==
The trains feature longitudinal seating, and are equipped with fare collection boxes at each end for wanman driver only operation. The trains are also the first Choshi Electric Railway trains to be equipped with air-conditioning, although initially it was used only in simple ventilation mode, due to the insufficient capacity of the line's power supply. From late June 2013, however, a static inverter was added, enabling the air-conditioning to be used.

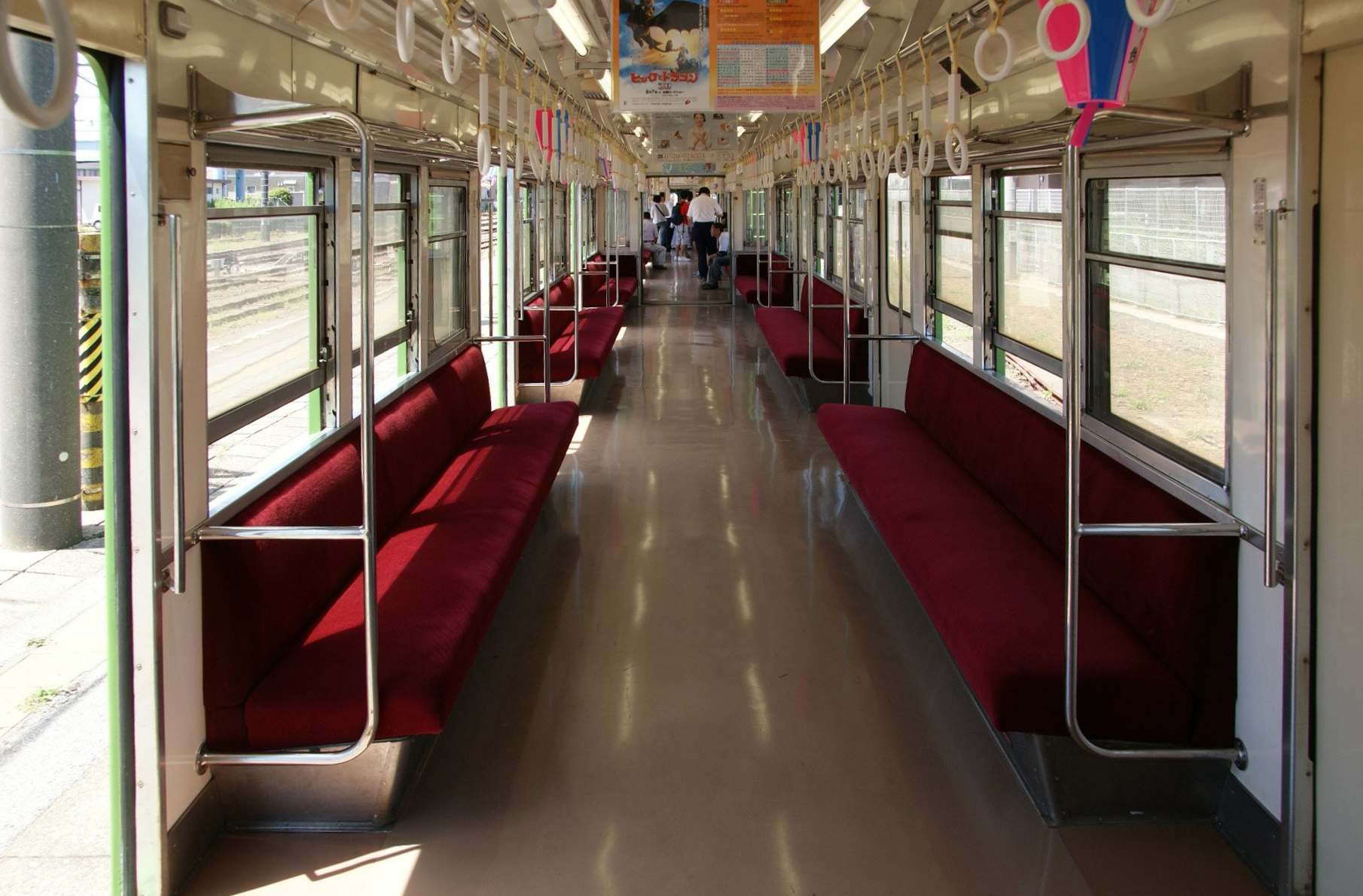
Interior view in August 2010

== History ==
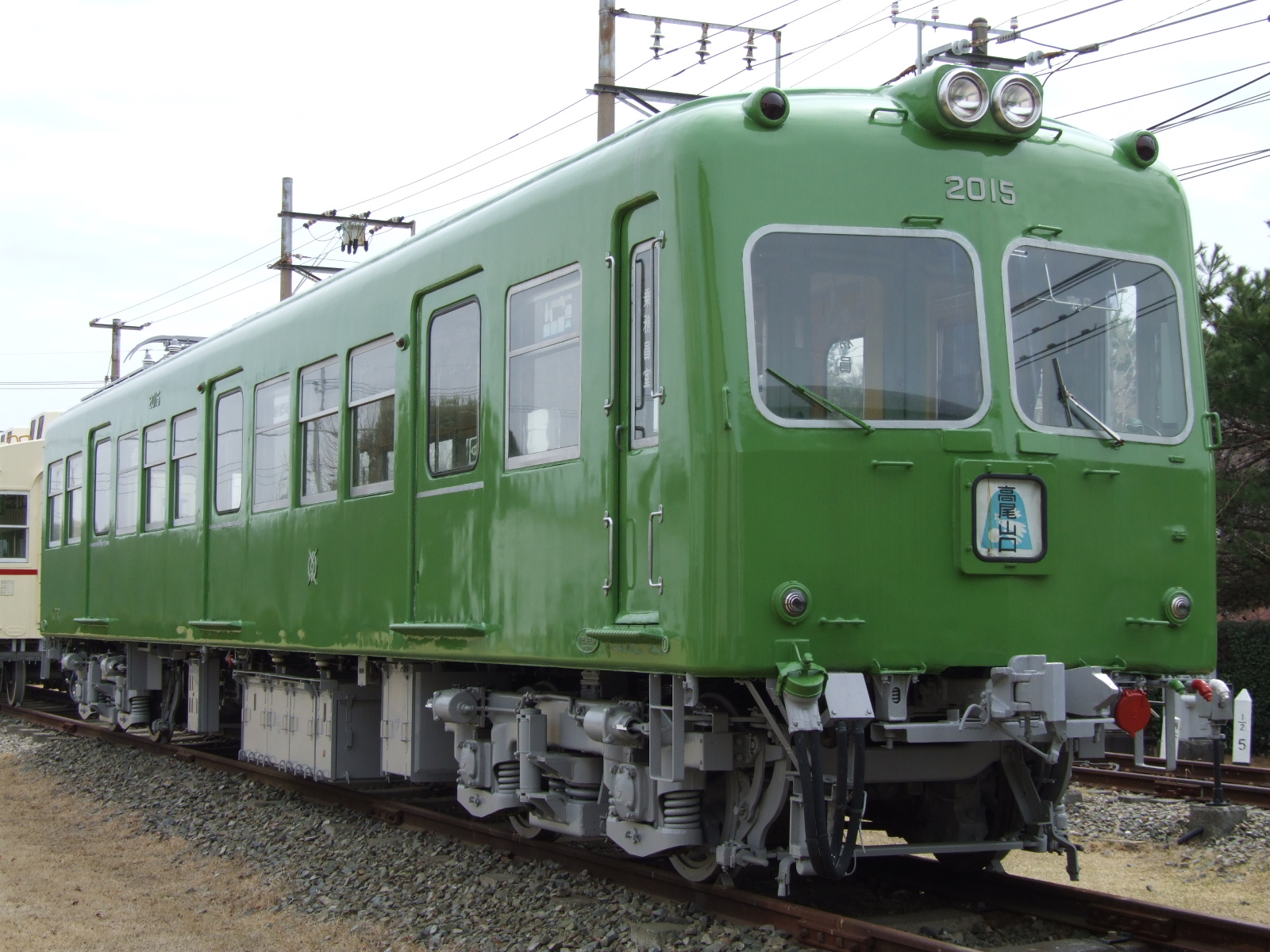
Preserved Keio 2010 series EMU car 2015 in April 2003

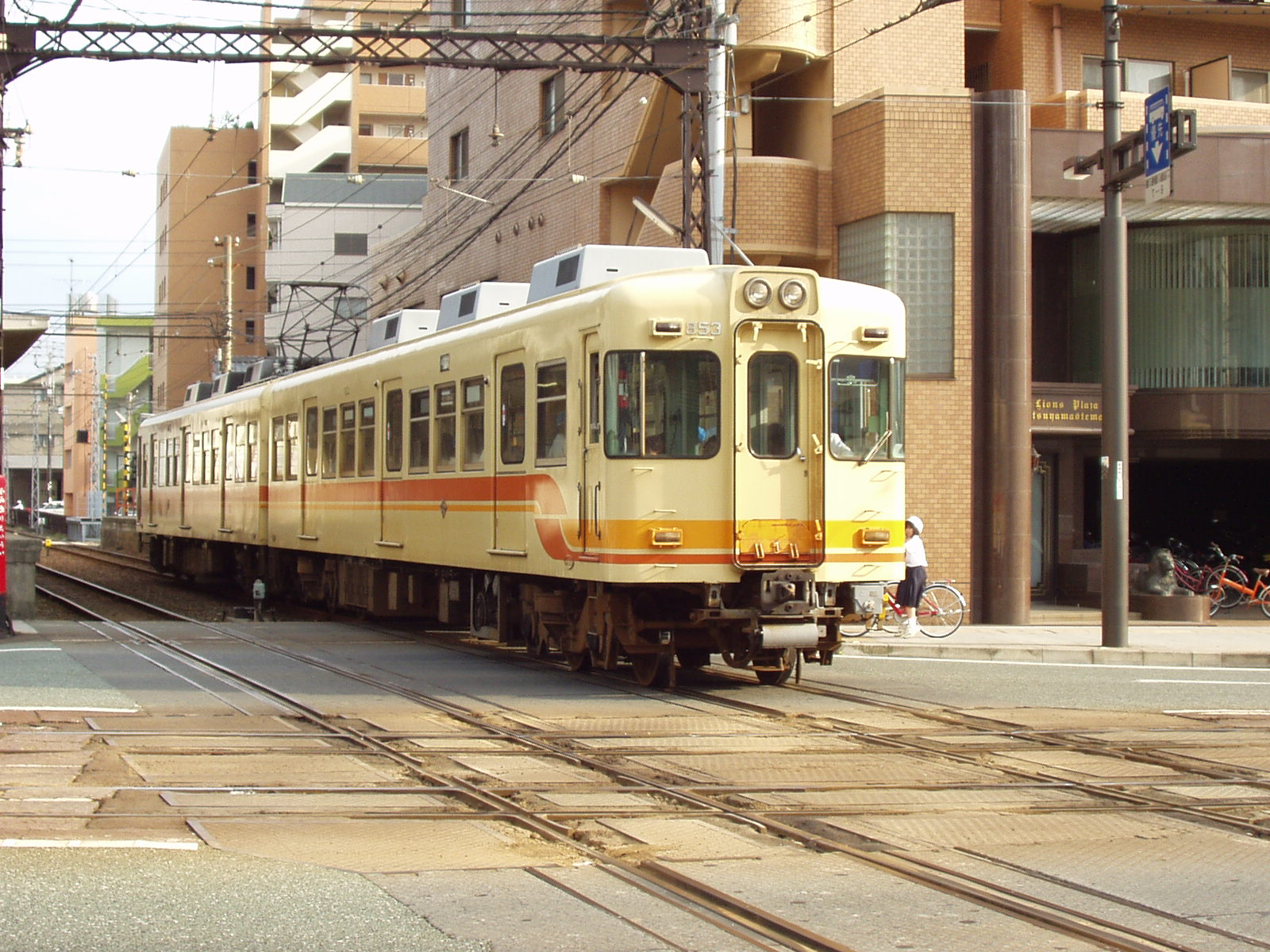
Iyo Railway set 823 (later Choshi Electric Railway set 2002) in June 2007

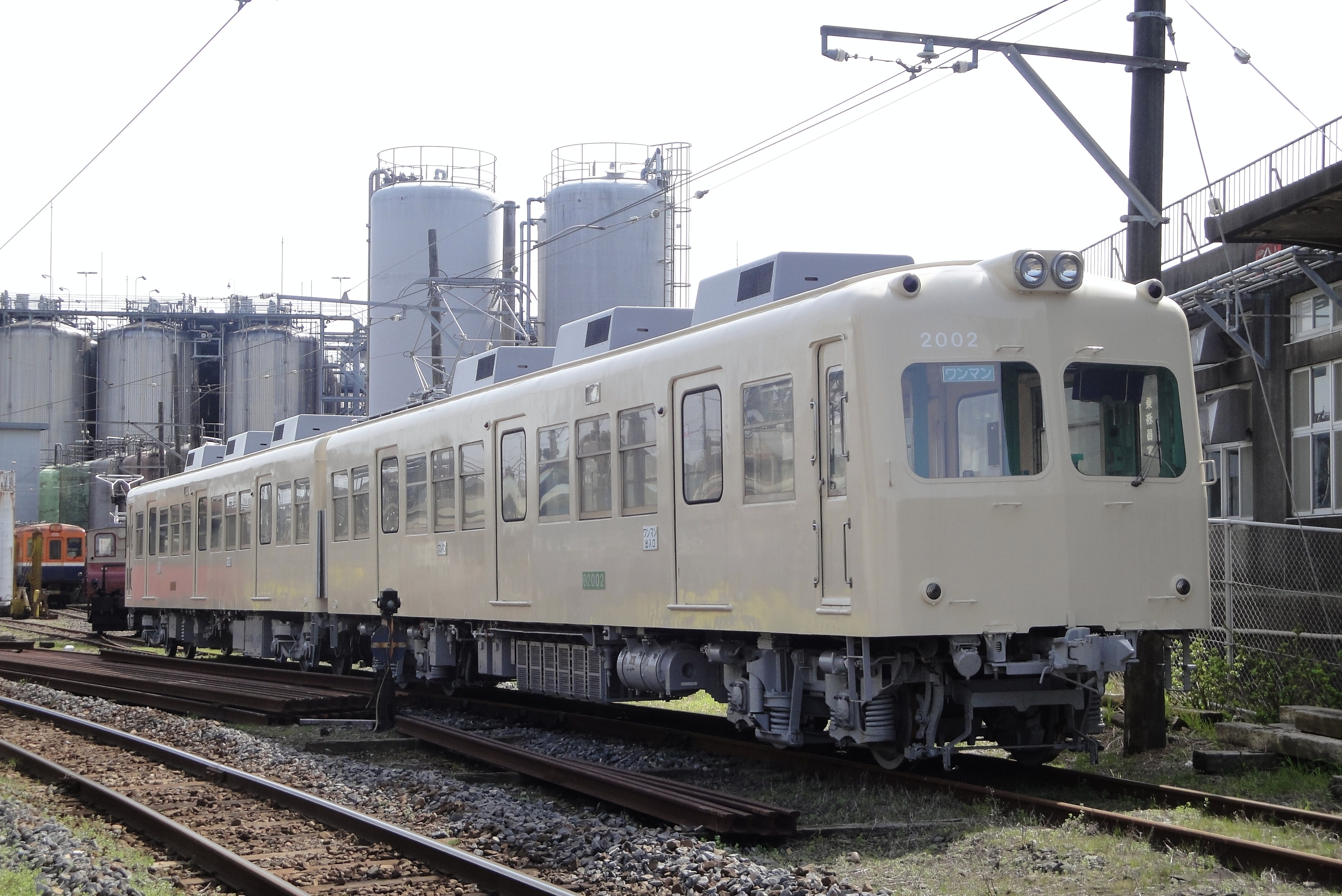
Set 2002 undergoing conversion/repainting work at Nakanocho Depot in March 2010

The four cars in operation were originally built in 1962 by Hitachi and Nippon Sharyo as 2010 series trains for use on the 1,372 mm (4 ft 6 in) gauge Keio Line in Tokyo. 18 2010 series cars were purchased from Keio between 1984 and 1985 by the Iyo Railway in Shikoku, becoming the 800 series. Regauging work for use on the 1,067 mm (3 ft 6 in) gauge Iyo line involved modifying the Nippon Sharyo NA-318 and Tokyu Car TS-321A bogies on the trailer (non-motored) cars and replacing the bogies on motored cars with Tokyu TS-307 bogies from former Keio Inokashira Line 1000 series EMUs withdrawn in 1984. On the Iyo Railway, the 800 series trains initially operated as 3-car sets, but in 1994, driving cabs based on the design of the former Keio 5000 series EMUs were added to the intermediate SaHa 850 cars to create two-car sets formed as MoHa 820 + KuHa 850. This is the reason for the differing style driving cabs on each end of the present-day 2000 series sets.

Two two-car 800 series trains (MoHa 822 + KuHa 852 and MoHa 823 + KuHa 853) were purchased from the Iyo Railway in November 2009, and were modified for driver-only-operation and repainted at the line's Nakanocho Depot by Keisei Sharyo engineers, becoming the Choshi Electric Railway 2000 series. The trains entered service on 24 July 2010.

=== Individual car histories ===
Set No.	Car No.	Date built	Manufacturer	Keio numbering	Iyo numbering
2001	DeHa 2001	August 1962	Hitachi	DeHa 2070	MoHa 822
2001	KuHa 2501	December 1962	Hitachi	SaHa 2575	SaHa 852, later KuHa 852
2002	DeHa 2002	August 1962	Hitachi	DeHa 2069	MoHa 823
2002	KuHa 2502	December 1962	Nippon Sharyo	SaHa 2576	SaHa 853, later KuHa 853

== Accidents ==
On 11 January 2014, at 08:19, set 2002 derailed on points on the approach to Kasagami-Kurohae Station while on a service from Tokawa to Choshi. Two of the train's bogies were derailed, but the train remained upright. The unit remained out of service due to the lack of funds to carry out repairs, but later in 2014, students from the Choshi Commercial Senior High School used crowdfunding to raise 4.84 million yen in a period of two months to help cover the cost of repair work. Repairs were completed in March 2015, with the train returning to passenger service on 4 April 2015.
