= 800 series =

800 series may refer to:

== Japanese train types ==
- 800 Series Shinkansen
- Chichibu Railway 800 series electric multiple unit
- Choshi Electric Railway 800 series electric multiple unit
- Keihan 800 series electric multiple unit
- Keikyu 800 series electric multiple unit
- Shin-Keisei N800 series electrical multiple unit
- Tobu 800 series, a variant of the Tobu 8000 series electric multiple unit

== Other ==
- GeForce 800M series of graphics processing units
- ThinkPad 800 series, a line of laptop computers
- Rover 800 Series car
- Sony Vaio 800 series computers

== See also ==
- British Rail Class 800
- 800 (disambiguation)

Preceded by Series 701-799 (disambiguation)	800 series	Succeeded by Series 801-899 (disambiguation)
Preceded by 700 series (disambiguation)	800 series	Succeeded by 900 series (disambiguation)
