= Kasagami-Kurohae Station =

Railway station in Chōshi, Chiba Prefecture, Japan

Coordinates: 35°43′42″N 140°51′25″E

Kasagami-Kurohae Station 笠上黒生駅
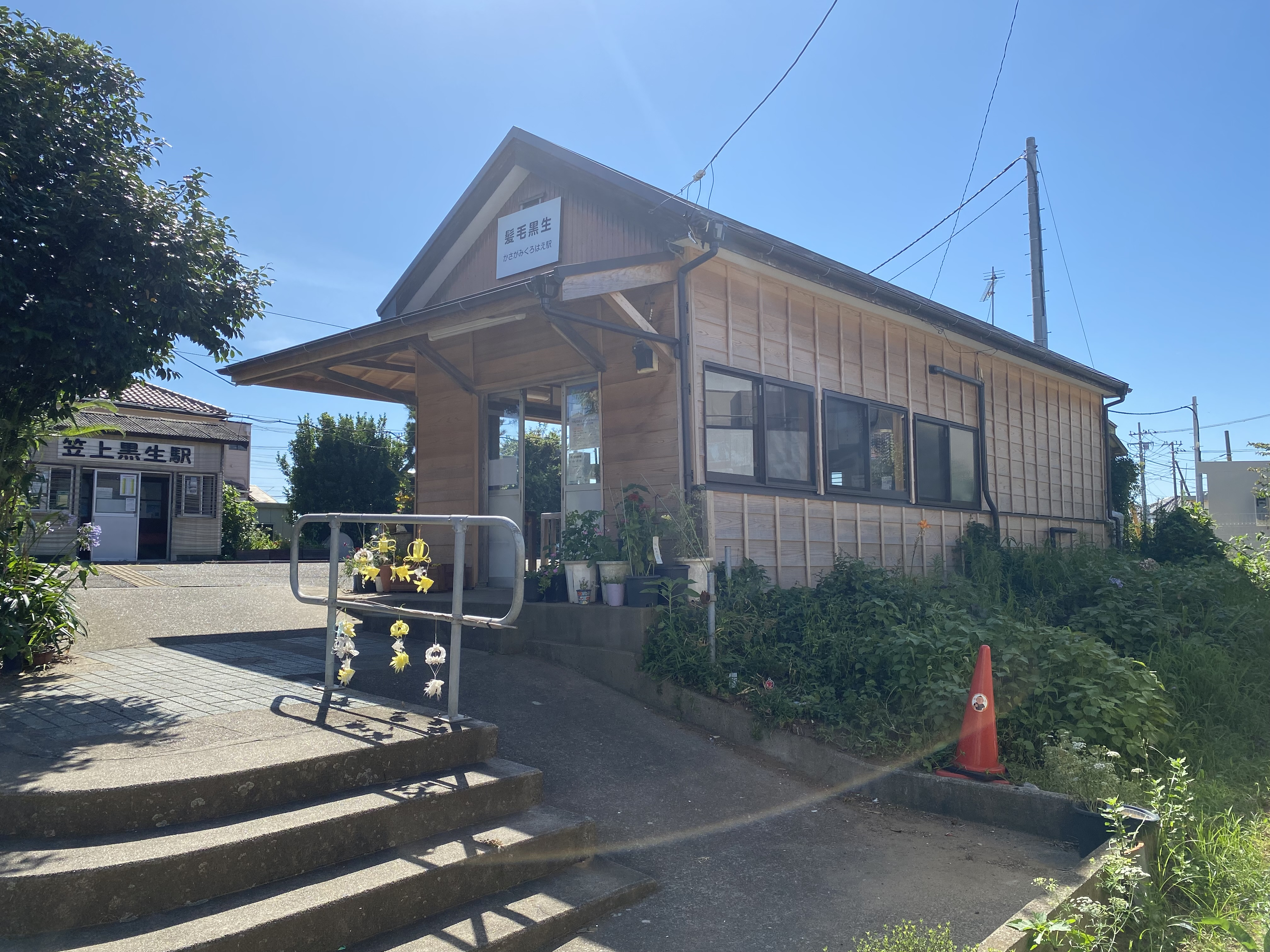
- The station entrance in July 2023

General information
- Location: 6015 Kasagami-chō; Chōshi, Chiba; Japan
- Operator: Choshi Electric Railway
- Line: Choshi Electric Railway Line
- Distance: 2.7 km (1.7 mi) from Chōshi
- Platforms: 2 side platforms
- Tracks: 2

Construction
- Parking: Yes

Other information
- Status: Staffed
- Station code: CD05

History
- Opened: 1 July 1925

Passengers
- FY2010: 139 daily

Services
Preceding station	Choshi Electric Railway	Following station
Moto-Chōshi towards Chōshi	Chōshi Electric Railway Line	Nishi-Ashikajima towards Tokawa
Location
- Location within Chiba Prefecture Location within Japan

Kasagami-Kurohae Station (Japanese: 笠上黒生駅, Hepburn: Kasagami-Kurohae-eki) is a railway station on the privately operated Chōshi Electric Railway Line in Chōshi, Chiba, Japan.

== Lines ==
Kasagami-Kurohae Station is served by the 6.4 km (4.0 mi) Chōshi Electric Railway Line from Chōshi to Tokawa. It is located between Moto-Chōshi and Nishi-Ashikajima stations, and is a distance of 2.7 km (1.7 mi) from Chōshi Station.

== Station layout ==
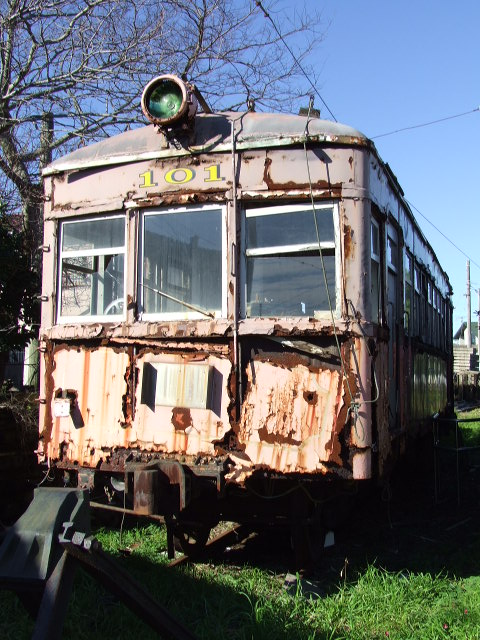
Withdrawn EMU car DeHa 101 dumped next to the station in December 2006

The station is staffed, and consists of two side platforms serving two tracks. This is the only station on the line where trains can pass in opposite directions.

The station is also the location for a power substation with a 300 kW silicon rectifier which supplies 600 V DC to the line's overhead wires. A loop and siding for freight services originally existed behind the up platform, but the loop was later removed, leaving just the siding. Withdrawn EMU car DeHa 101 was previously dumped in this siding, but was disposed of in September 2009 to make space to store newly delivered 2000 series set 2002 awaiting modifications at Nakanochō depot.

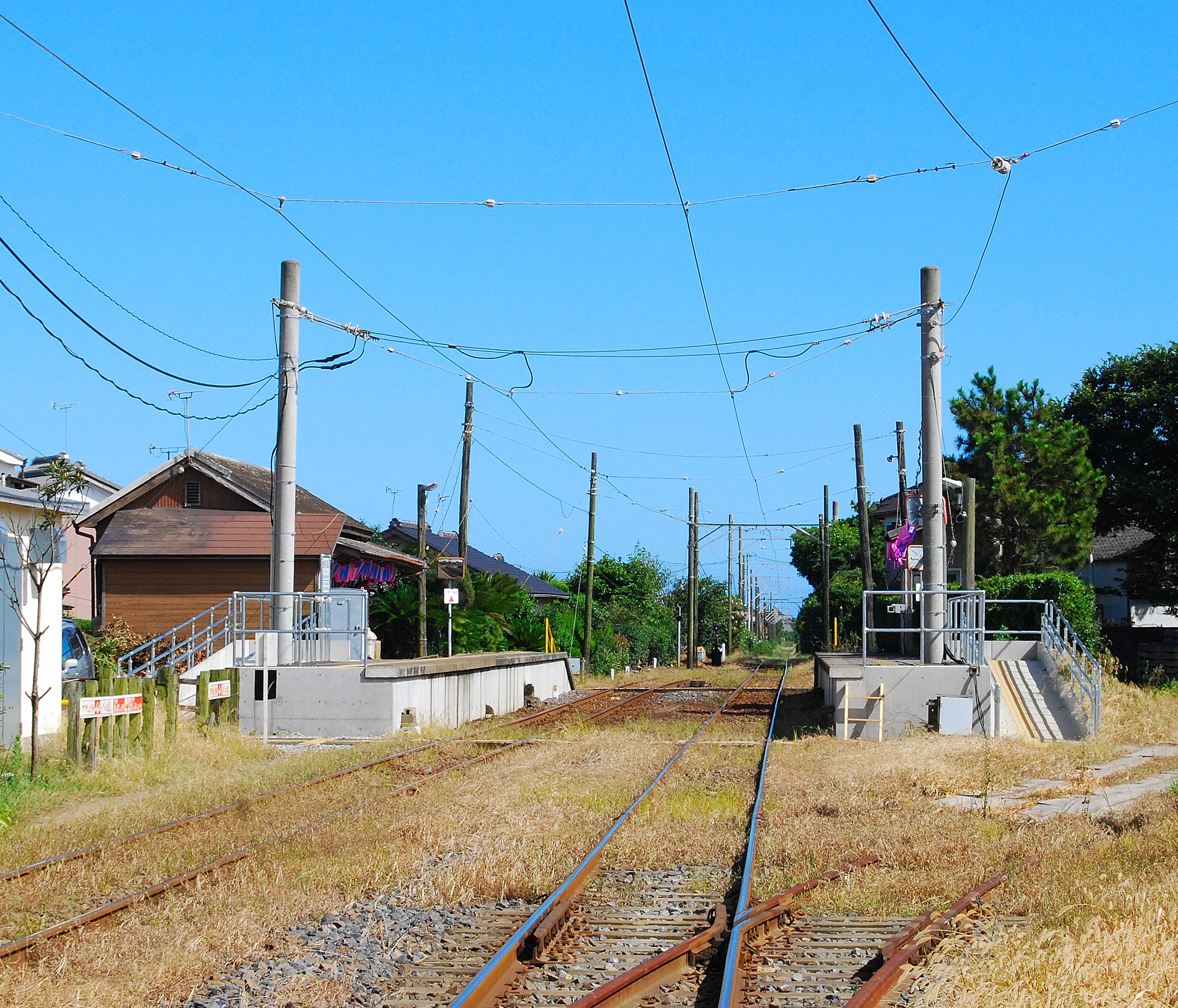
A view of the two station platforms in August 2010

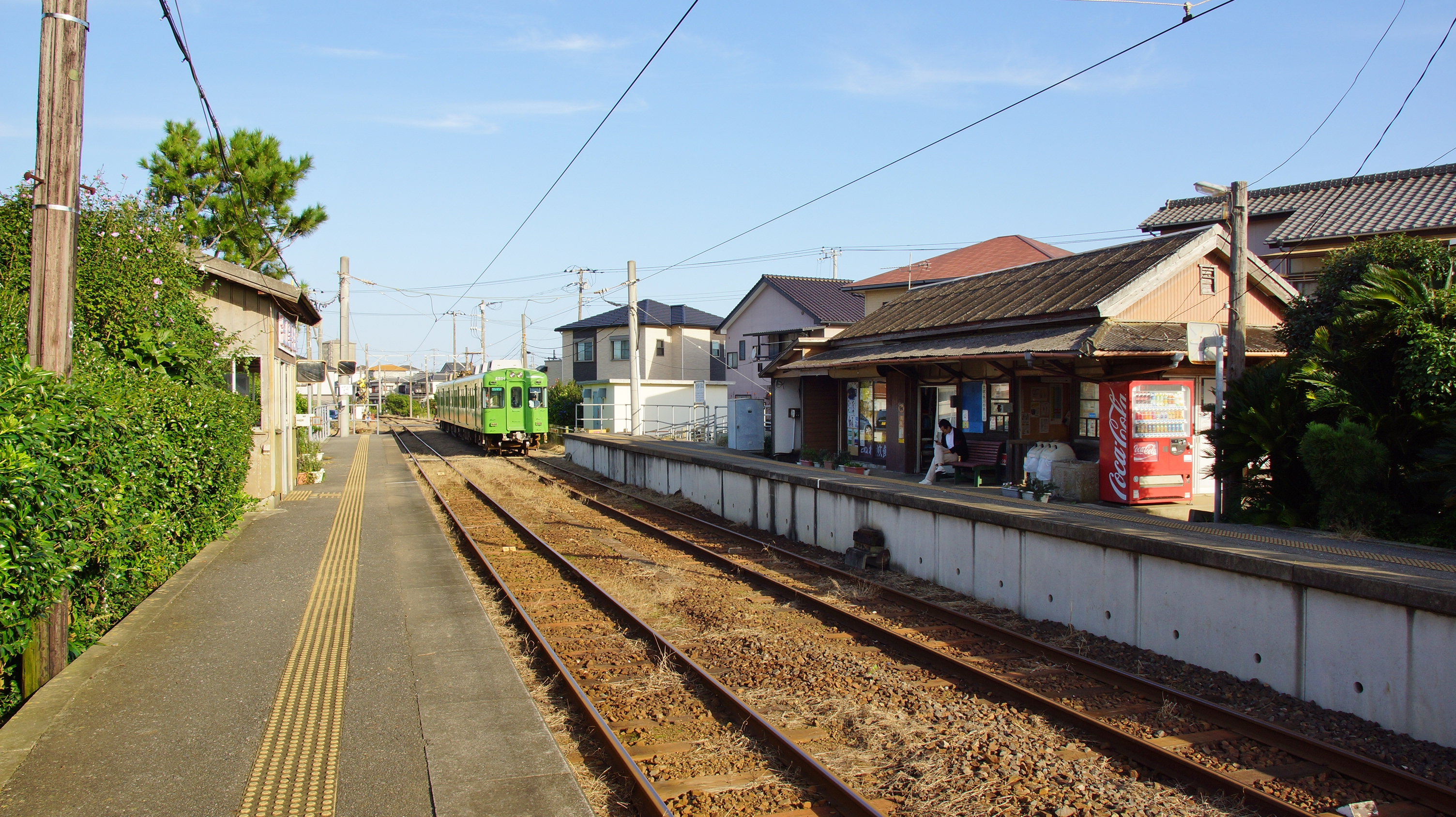
The platforms looking northward (toward Choshi) in October 2015

== History ==
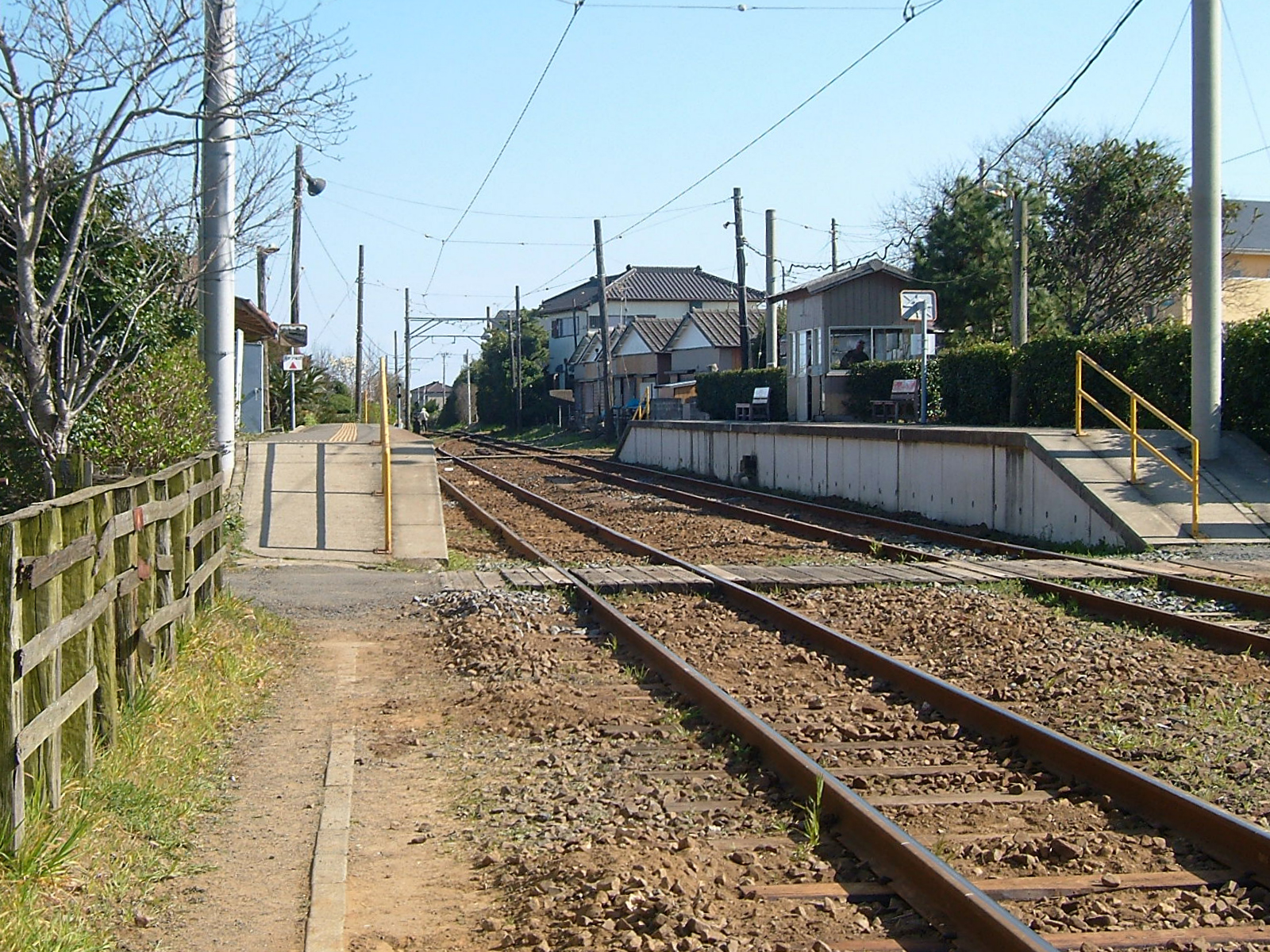
The station platforms in March 2007, before the addition of access ramps

Kasagami-Kurohae Station opened on 1 July 1925. The station name combined the name of the Kasagami-chō area in which the station was located with the name of the neighbouring Kurohae area, which was famous for roof tiles that were transported by the railway.

In June 1995, a head-on collision occurred north of Kasagami-Kurohae Station between on a down (Tokawa-bound) service and DeHa 1001 on an up (Chōshi-bound) service. Both cars sustained front-end damage

In May 2010, platforms were extended to handle two-car trains in preparation for the entry into service of new 2000 series trains, and new access ramps were added.

In 2015, station naming rights were sold to the hair product company Mesocare+, and on 1 December 2015, for a period of one year, station signs were changed to read "Kaminoke-Kurohae" (髪毛黒生; lit. "hair grows black"), a play on the original station name.

On 6 August 2025, Nauru acquired the station naming rights, and signs were changed to read "Nauru Kyowakoku" (ナウル共和国; lit. "Republic of Nauru"). Announcements in Nauruan also began to be played on trains arriving at the station.

== Accidents ==
A head-on collision occurred in June 1995 north of Kasagami-Kurohae Station between DeHa 701 on a down (Tokawa-bound) service and DeHa 1001 on an up (Chōshi-bound) service. Both cars sustained front-end damage. The former railcar was repainted and returned to service in April 1996.

On 11 January 2014, at 8:19 a.m., 2000 series 2-car EMU set 2002 from Tokawa to Chōshi derailed on points while approaching the station. Two of the train's bogies were derailed, but the train remained upright and none of the nine passengers on board was injured.

== Passenger statistics ==
In fiscal 2010, the station was used by an average of 139 passengers daily (boarding passengers only). The passenger figures for past years are as shown below.

Fiscal year	Daily average
2007	262
2008	148
2009	151
2010	139

== Surrounding area ==
- Chōshi Port Tower

== See also ==
- List of railway stations in Japan
