= Choshi Electric Railway 800 series =

Class of 1 Japanese electric railcar

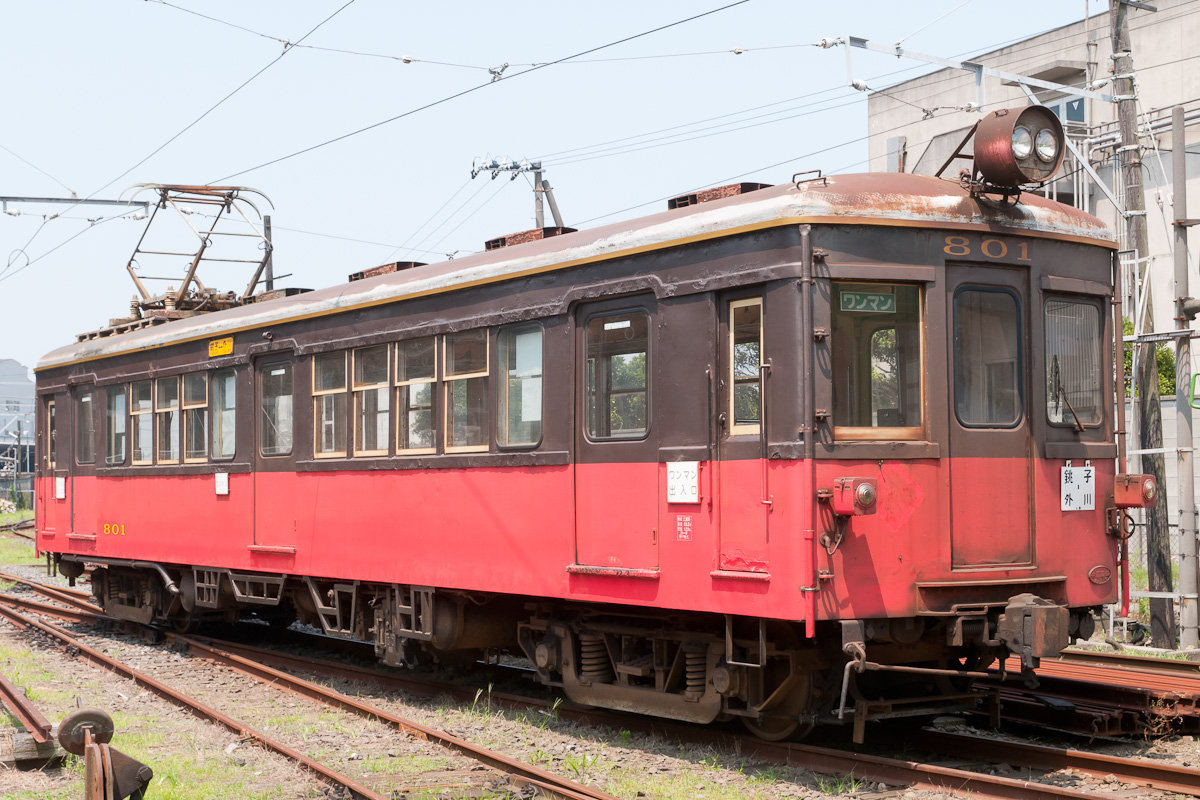
- DeHa 801 at Nakanocho Depot in July 2010
- In service: 1986–September 2010
- Manufacturer: Teikoku Sharyo
- Constructed: 1950
- Refurbished: February 1986
- Number built: 1 vehicle
- Number in service: None
- Formation: Single car
- Fleet numbers: DeHa 801
- Capacity: 120 (40 seated)
- Operators: Choshi Electric Railway
- Depots: Nakanochō

Specifications
- Car body construction: Steel
- Car length: 16,210 mm (53 ft 2 in)
- Width: 2,700 mm (8 ft 10 in)
- Height: 4,033 mm (13 ft 2.8 in)
- Doors: 3 per side
- Weight: 28.2 t
- Traction system: MB-64-C (48.49 kW x4)
- Power output: 194 kW
- Electric system(s): 600 V DC overhead wire
- Current collection: PS13 pantograph (x1)
- Bogies: Nippon Sharyo D-16
- Track gauge: 1,067 mm (3 ft 6 in)

The Choshi Electric Railway 800 series (銚子電鉄800形, Chōshi Dentetsu 800-gata) was an electric multiple unit (EMU) train type operated by the private railway operator Choshi Electric Railway in Chiba Prefecture, Japan, between 1986 and September 2010.

== Build details ==
No.	Former No.	Manufacturer	Build date	Conversion date	Withdrawal date
DeHa 801	MoHa 106	Teikoku Sharyo	1950	12 February 1986	September 2010

== Interior ==
The train had longitudinal seating and was equipped with fare collection boxes at each end for wanman driver only operation. It was not equipped with air-conditioning.

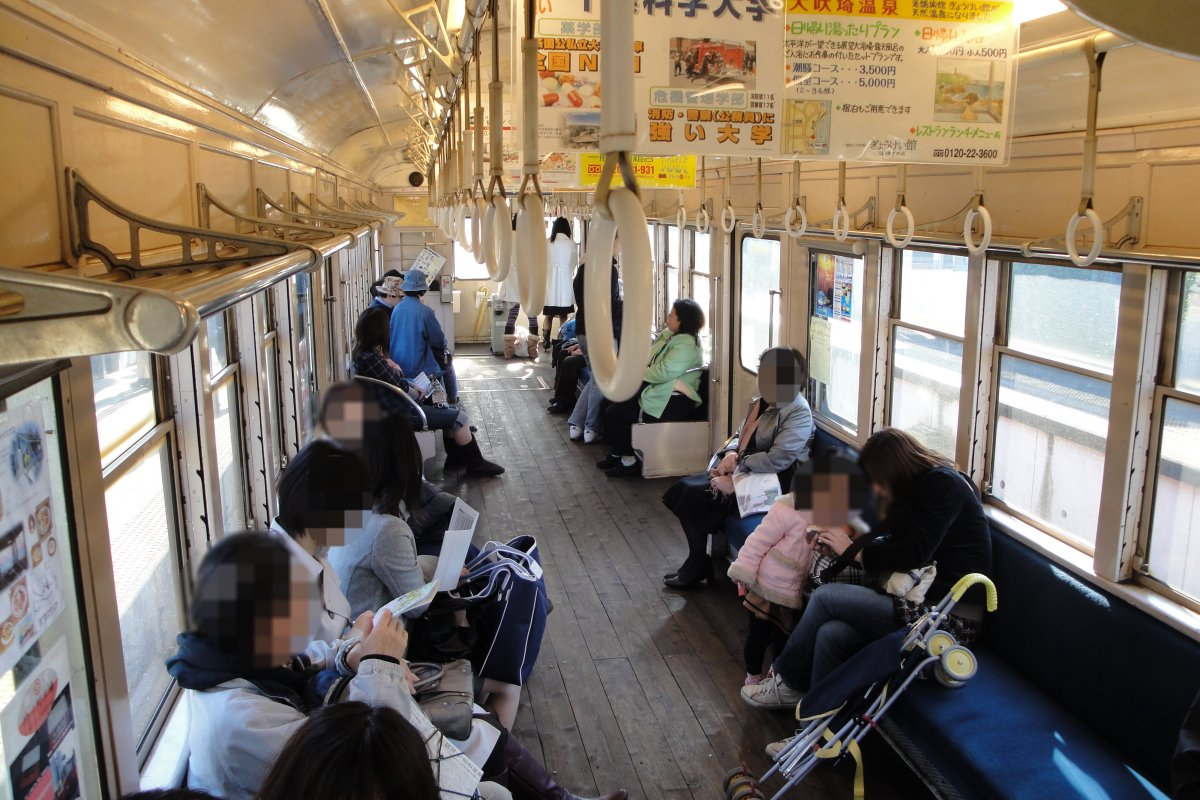
Interior view of DeHa 801, November 2009

== History ==
One single car was converted in February 1986 from former Iyo Railway 100 series car MoHa 106, purchased in October 1985. This car was built in 1950 by Teikoku Sharyo as KuHa 405, and converted to become single-car MoHa 106 with an additional driving cab in 1961. The second driving cab was subsequently taken out of use and a gangway door added, but from 1967, the driving cab was reinstated, with the gangway door left in place.

Conversion for use on the Choshi Electric Railway involved sealing the gangway in the later added cab end (at the Tokawa end), and replacement of the original Hitachi MIC bogies with Nippon Sharyo D-16 type bogies.

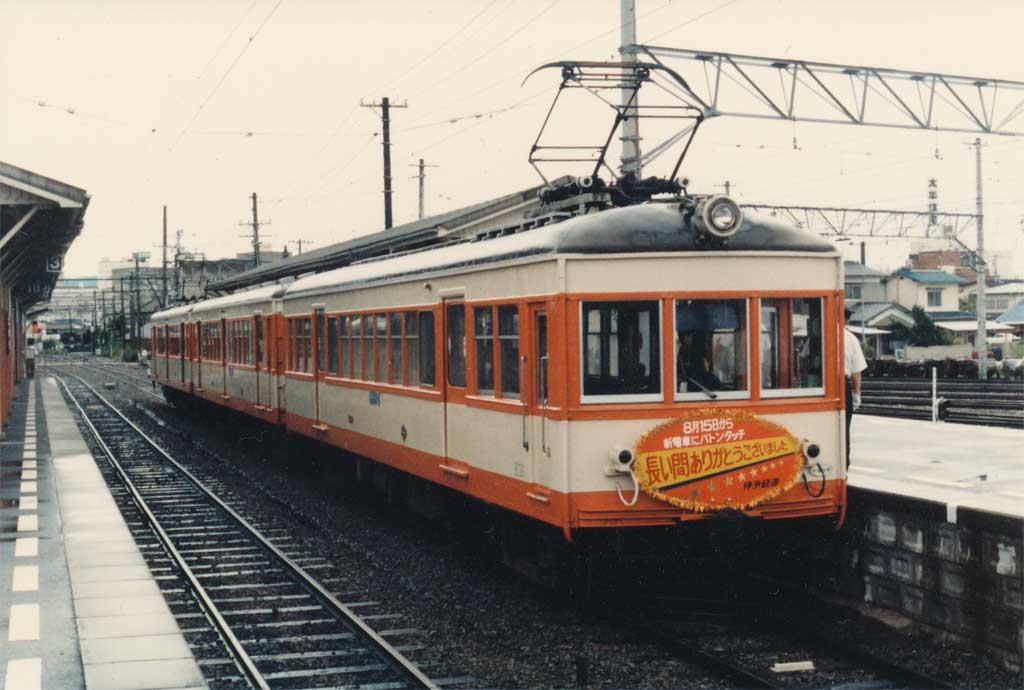
Iyo Railway MoHa 103 (car of the same type) shortly before withdrawal in 1984

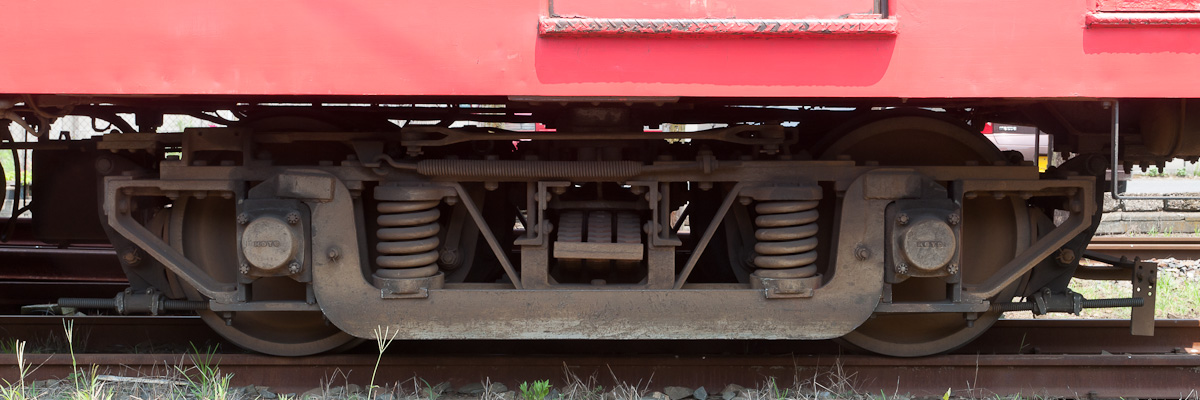
Nippon Sharyo D-16 bogie, July 2010

The car was repainted in 1990 from the earlier red and cream livery to the "new" Choshi Electric Railway livery of brown and red.

It was withdrawn after its final day of operation on 23 September 2010, and was then used for a time as a maintenance vehicle for inspection of overhead power lines. It was initially stored in the loop next to Tokawa Station before being moved to storage behind Kasagami-Kurohae Station. From 1 May 2015, parked next to Tokawa Station, the car was used to house the Keiyo Towa Pharmaceutical Shōwa Nostalgia Museum, containing exhibits of toys and everyday items from the Shōwa period (1925–1989). The exhibits were removed in August 2017, and the train interior returned to the state from its time in operation.

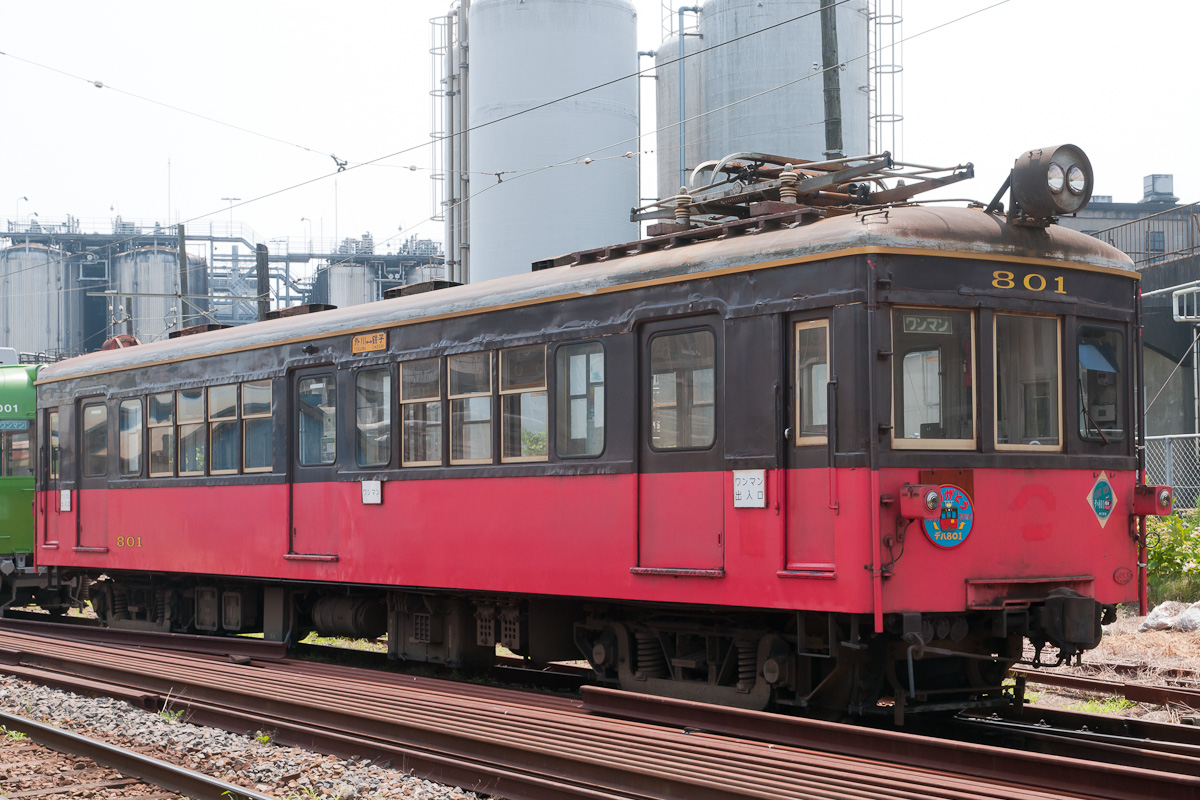
DeHa 801 viewed from the up (Choshi) end in July 2010

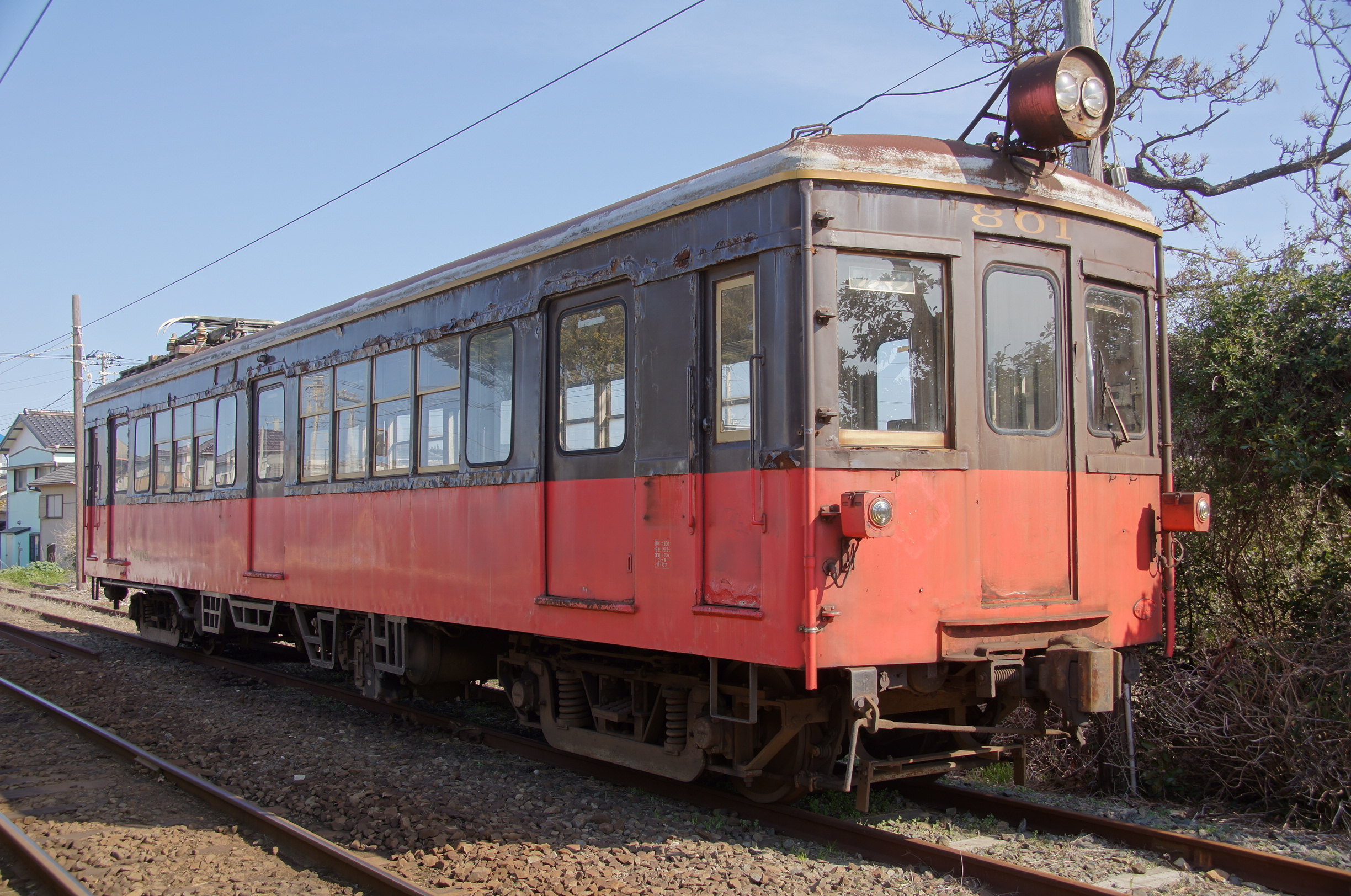
Withdrawn DeHa 801 stored next to Tokawa Station in January 2012

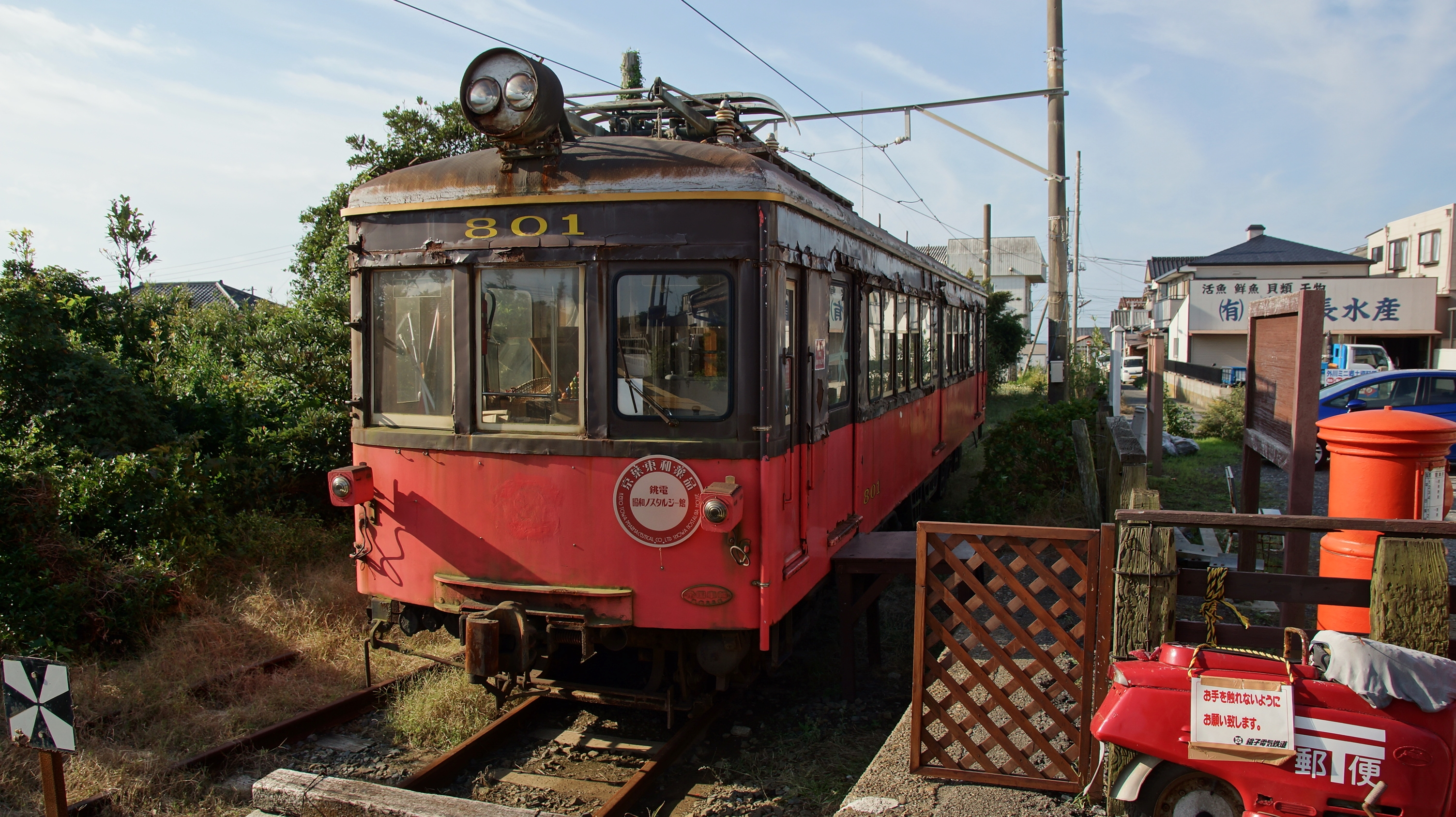
Withdrawn DeHa 801 as the Keiyo Towa Pharmaceutical Shōwa Nostalgia Museum at Tokawa Station in October 2015

Exposed to the elements, by 2017 the car body had corroded significantly due to rust, to the extent that there were holes in places. A restoration project was launched, in which two commercial sponsors donated materials and labor for rust treatment, bodywork repair and subsequent repainting with rust-proof paint. Students from the local Choshi Commercial Senior High School assisted with the restoration work. After completion of the repairs, the car was unveiled and reopened to the public on 23 December 2017, with a two-week exhibition of photographs from its time in operation.

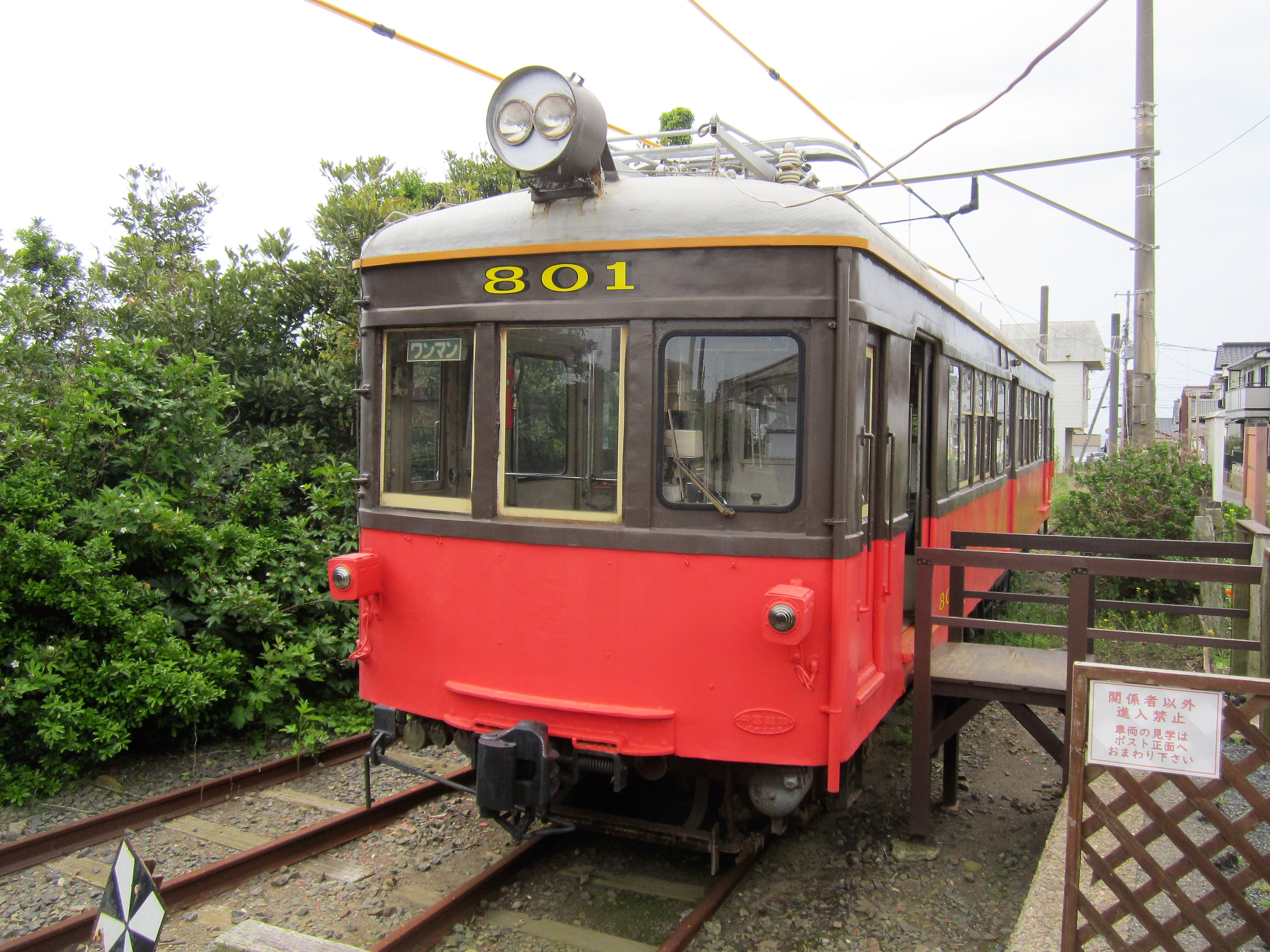
DeHa 801 in April 2019, post-restoration

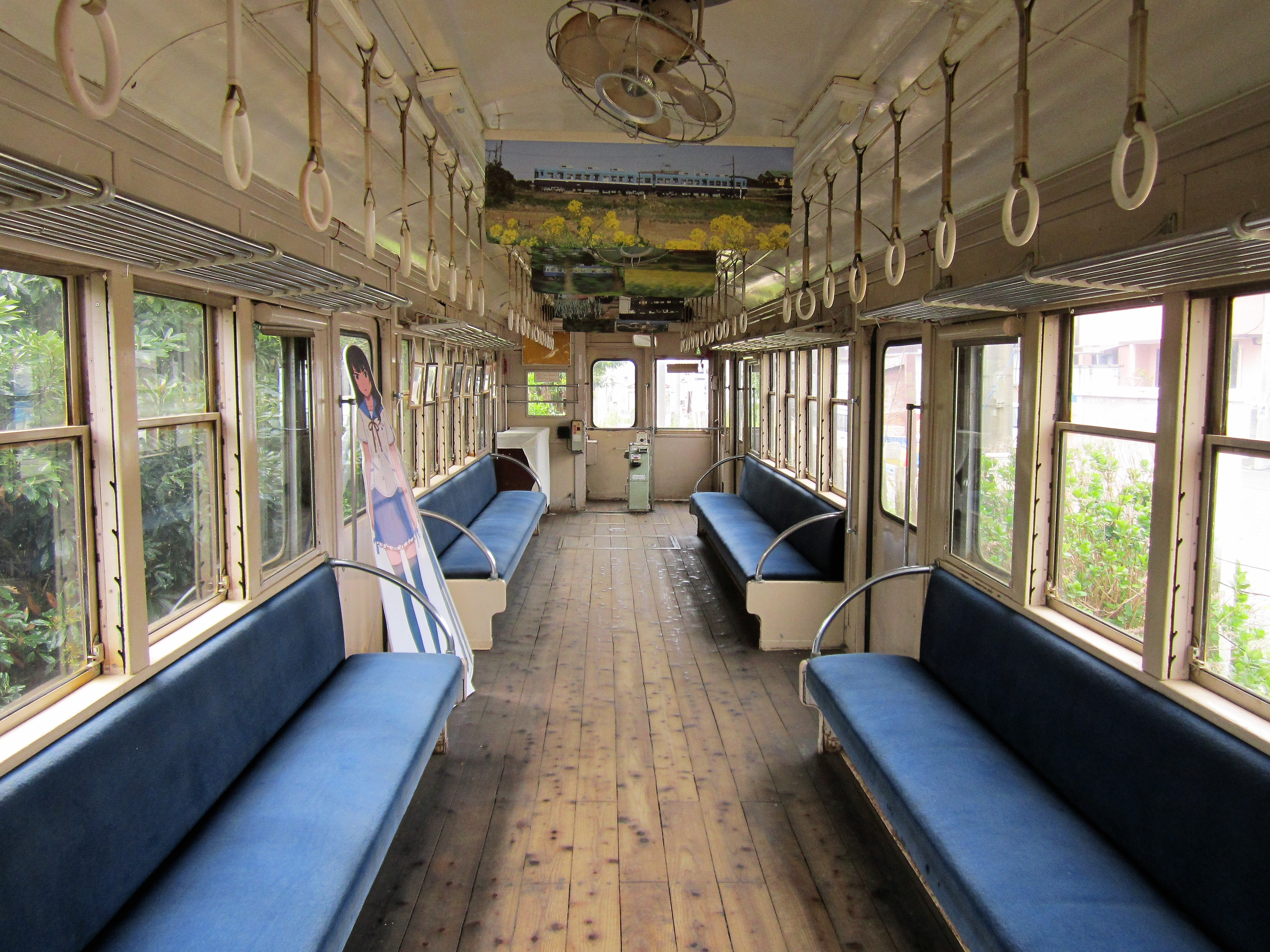
Restored car interior, April 2019
