= Keikyu 700 series =

Japanese train type

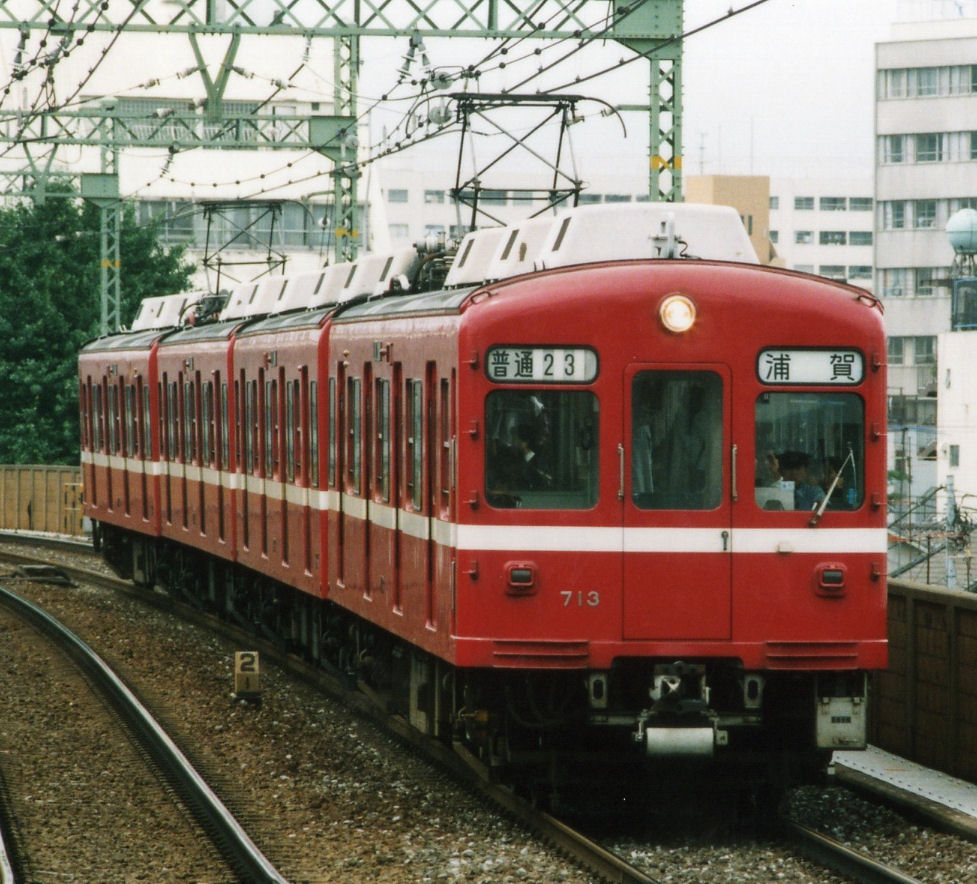
- Set 713 in July 1995
- In service: 1967–2005
- Manufacturers: Tokyu Car Corporation, Kawasaki Heavy Industries
- Constructed: 1967–1971
- Refurbished: 1980–1988
- Number built: 84 vehicles (21 sets)
- Number in service: None
- Formation: 4 cars per set
- Operator: Keikyu

Specifications
- Car body construction: Steel
- Car length: 18 m (59 ft 1 in) (end cars); 17 m (55 ft 9 in) (intermediate cars)
- Doors: 4 single-leaf sliding doors per side
- Power output: 150 kW x 4 per motor car
- Electric system: 1,500 V DC
- Current collection: Pantograph
- Track gauge: 1,435 mm (4 ft 8 1/2 in)

The Keikyu 700 series (京急700形) was a DC electric multiple unit (EMU) commuter train type operated by the private operator Keikyu on commuter services in the Tokyo area of Japan from 1967 until 2005.

The 700 series was the first Keikyu stock type to have 4 doors on each side. A total of 84 cars were built between 1967 and 1971.

The fleet was withdrawn between 1998 and 2005, and 20 cars were transferred to Takamatsu-Kotohira Electric Railroad (Kotoden).

== Interior ==
Passenger accommodation consisted of longitudinal bench seating throughout.

== History ==
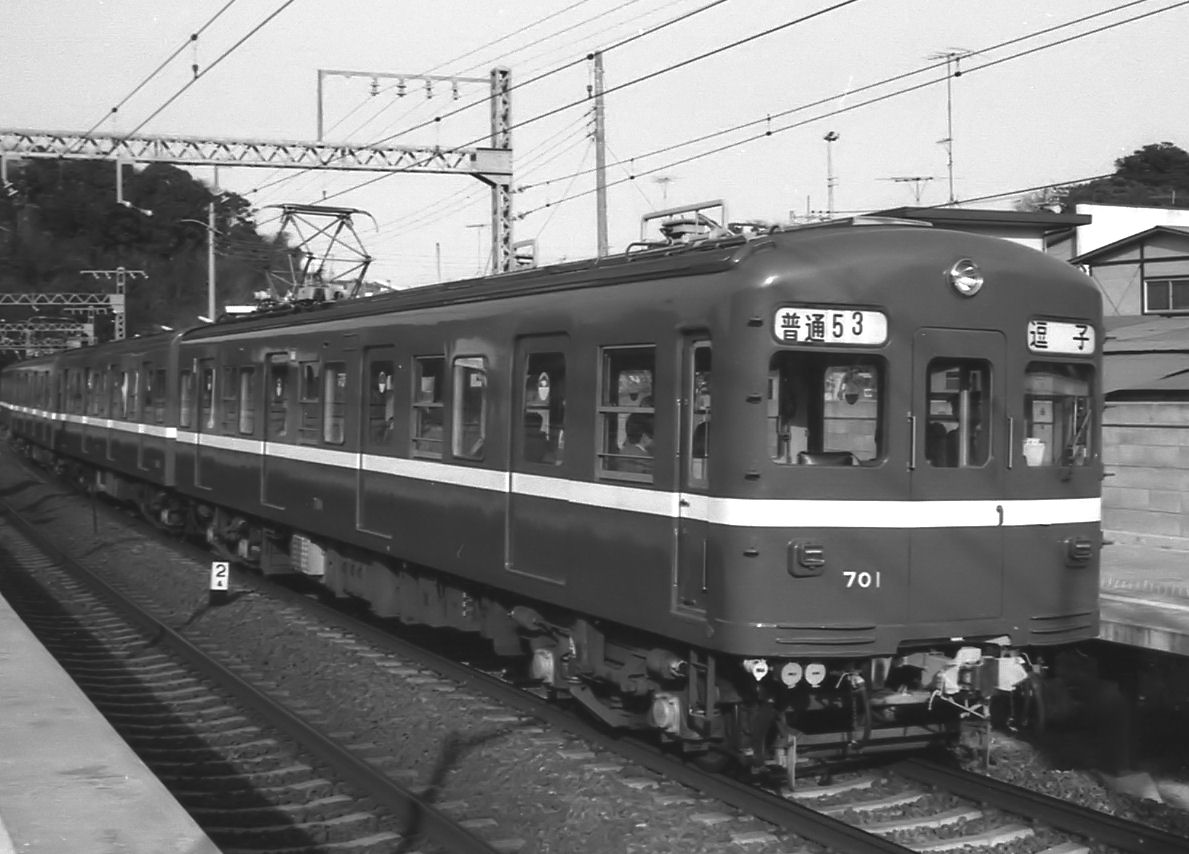
1st-batch set 701 in 1985 before retro-fitting with air-conditioning

A total of 84 vehicles (21 four-car sets) were built between 1967 and 1971, initially without air-conditioning. The entire fleet was refurbished between 1980 and 1988, including the retro-fitting of air-conditioning.

Withdrawals started in 1998. A farewell ceremony was held at Keikyu Kawasaki Station on 28 November 2005, with the last revenue workings continuing on the Keikyu Daishi Line until 30 November.

== Resale ==
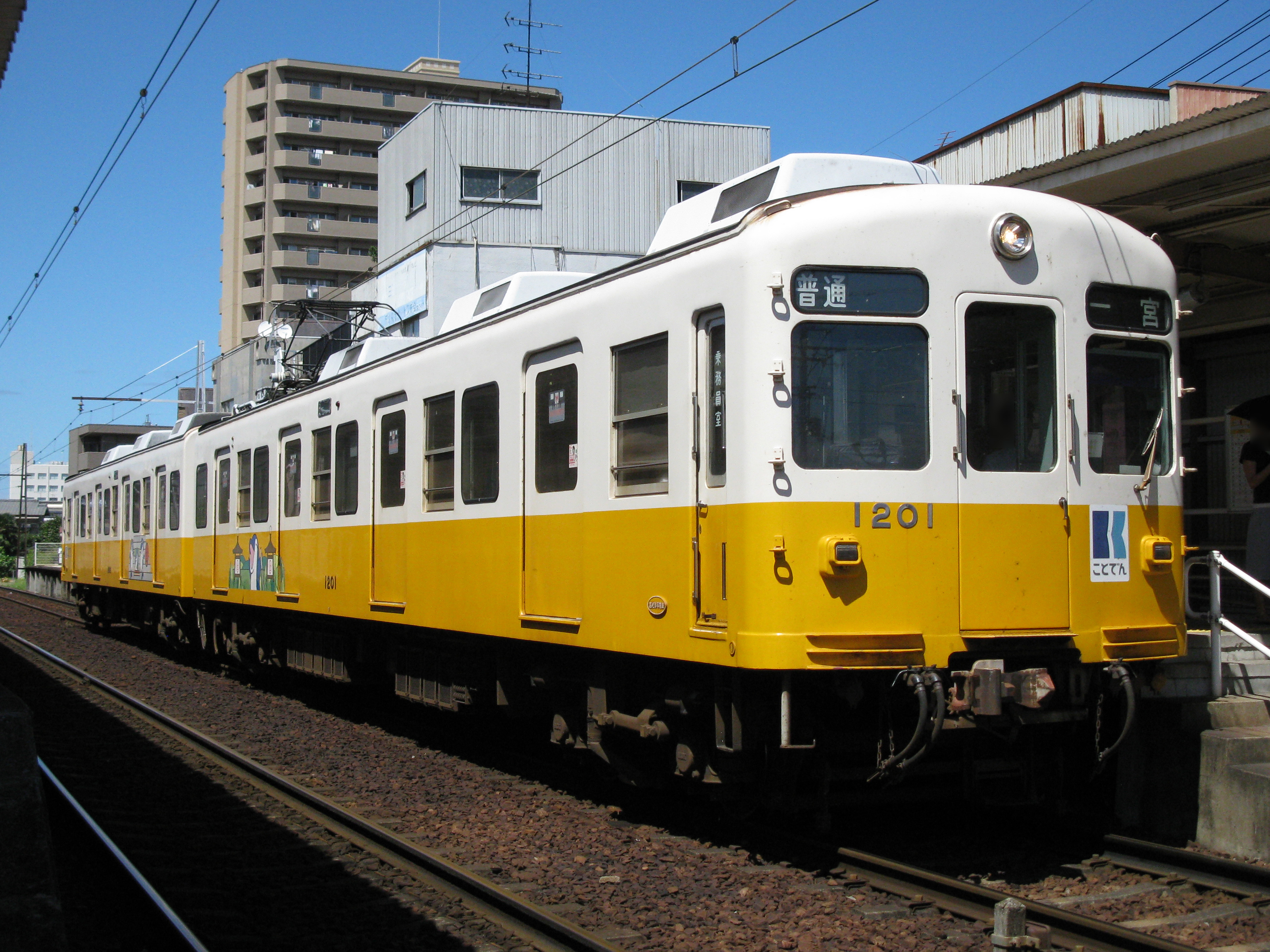
Kotoden 1200 series, August 2010

A number of 700 series cars were resold to the Takamatsu-Kotohira Electric Railroad ("Kotoden") in Shikoku, where they became the 2-car 1200 series. The identities and histories of the 700 series cars sold to Kotoden are as shown below.

| Keikyu No. | Type | Withdrawn | Resold to Kotoden | Kotoden No. |
|---|---|---|---|---|
| 701 | Muc | 10 March 2005 | 6 July 2005 | 1212 |
| 702 | Msc | 10 March 2005 | 6 July 2005 | 1211 |
| 703 | Muc | 10 March 2005 | 7 July 2005 | 1214 |
| 704 | Msc | 10 March 2005 | 7 July 2005 | 1213 |
| 705 | Muc | 19 July 2002 | 10 March 2003 | 1202 |
| 706 | Msc | 19 July 2002 | 10 March 2003 | 1201 |
| 723 | Muc | 31 March 2005 | 3 August 2005 | 1216 |
| 724 | Msc | 31 March 2005 | 3 August 2005 | 1215 |
| 727 | Muc | 19 July 2002 | 3 August 2005 | 1204 |
| 728 | Msc | 19 July 2002 | 3 August 2005 | 1203 |
| 731 | Muc | 26 July 2002 | 18 March 2003 | 1206 |
| 732 | Msc | 26 July 2002 | 18 March 2003 | 1205 |
| 733 | Muc | 15 August 2003 | 24 October 2004 | 1208 |
| 734 | Msc | 15 August 2003 | 24 October 2004 | 1207 |
| 735 | Muc | 30 November 2005 | 3 July 2006 | 1252 |
| 736 | Msc | 30 November 2005 | 3 July 2006 | 1251 |
| 737 | Muc | 5 March 2004 | 24 October 2004 | 1210 |
| 738 | Msc | 5 March 2004 | 24 October 2004 | 1209 |
| 739 | Muc | 30 November 2005 | 13 December 2006 | 1256 |
| 740 | Msc | 30 November 2005 | 13 December 2006 | 1255 |
| 741 | Muc | 30 November 2005 | 5 July 2006 | 1254 |
| 742 | Msc | 30 November 2005 | 5 July 2006 | 1253 |
