= Choshi Electric Railway 700 series =

Class of 2 Japanese electric railcars

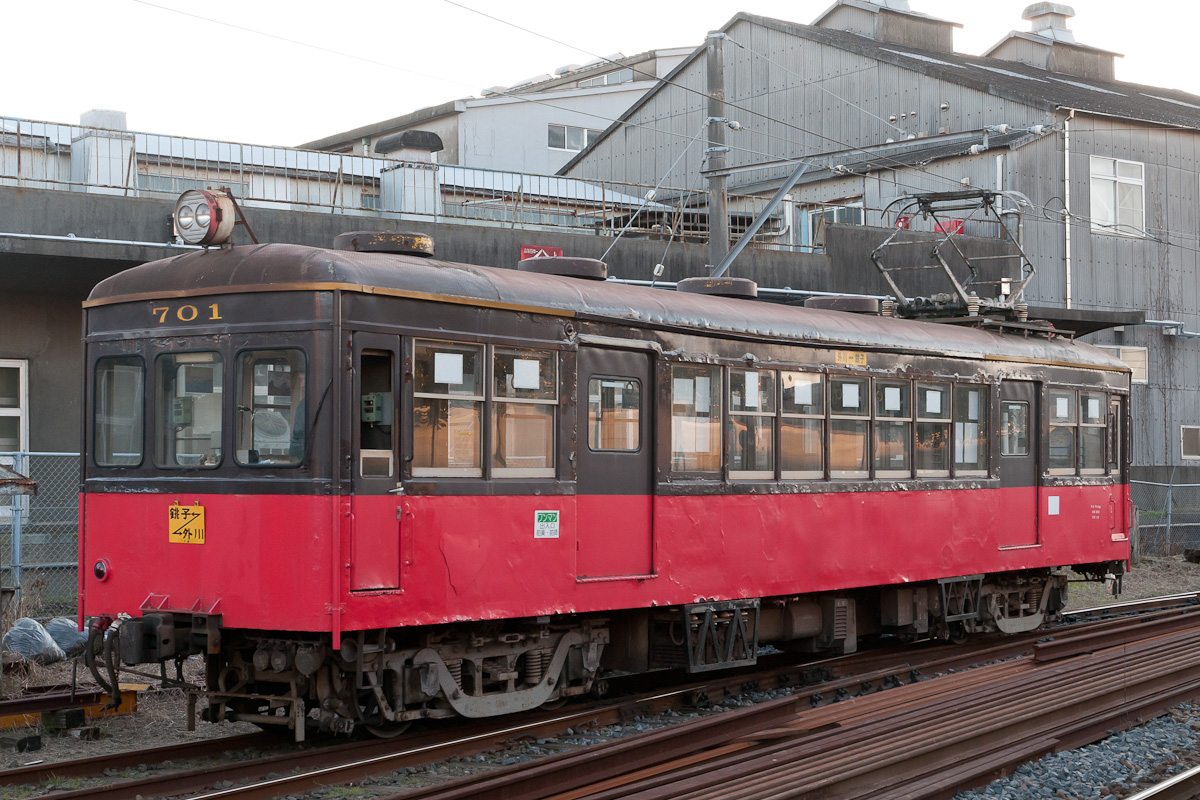
- DeHa 701 at Nakanochō Depot, January 2010
- In service: 1978–2010
- Replaced: DeHa 201
- Constructed: 1942
- Number built: 2 vehicles
- Number in service: None
- Number preserved: 2 vehicles
- Formation: Single car
- Fleet numbers: DeHa 701/702
- Capacity: 110 (42 seated)
- Operators: Choshi Electric Railway
- Depots: Nakanochō

Specifications
- Car body construction: Steel
- Car length: 15,365 mm (50 ft 4.9 in)
- Width: 2,743 mm (9 ft 0 in)
- Height: 4,134 mm (13 ft 6.8 in)
- Doors: 2 per side
- Weight: 26.0 t
- Traction system: SE-119C (52 kW x2)
- Power output: 104 kW
- Electric system(s): 600 V DC overhead wire
- Current collection: PS13 pantograph (x1)
- Bogies: Sumitomo KS-33S
- Track gauge: 1,067 mm (3 ft 6 in)

The Choshi Electric Railway 700 series (銚子電鉄700形, Chōshi Dentetsu 700-gata) was an electric multiple unit (EMU) train type operated by the private railway operator Choshi Electric Railway in Chiba Prefecture, Japan, between 1978 and 2010. The two single cars were converted from former Ohmi Railway MoHa 50 EMU cars, which were built in 1942.

== Build details ==
| No. | Former No. | Build date | Withdrawal date |
|---|---|---|---|
| DeHa 701 | MoHa 51 | 1942 | September 2010 |
| DeHa 702 | MoHa 52 | 1942 | January 2010 |

== Operation ==
The two DeHa 700 cars were not able to operate in multiple with other types on the railway, but were often used running together in multiple on rush-hour services.

== Interior ==
The trains had longitudinal seating, and were not air-conditioned, using ceiling-mounted fans. DeHa 701 was equipped with fare collection boxes at each end for wanman driver only operation.

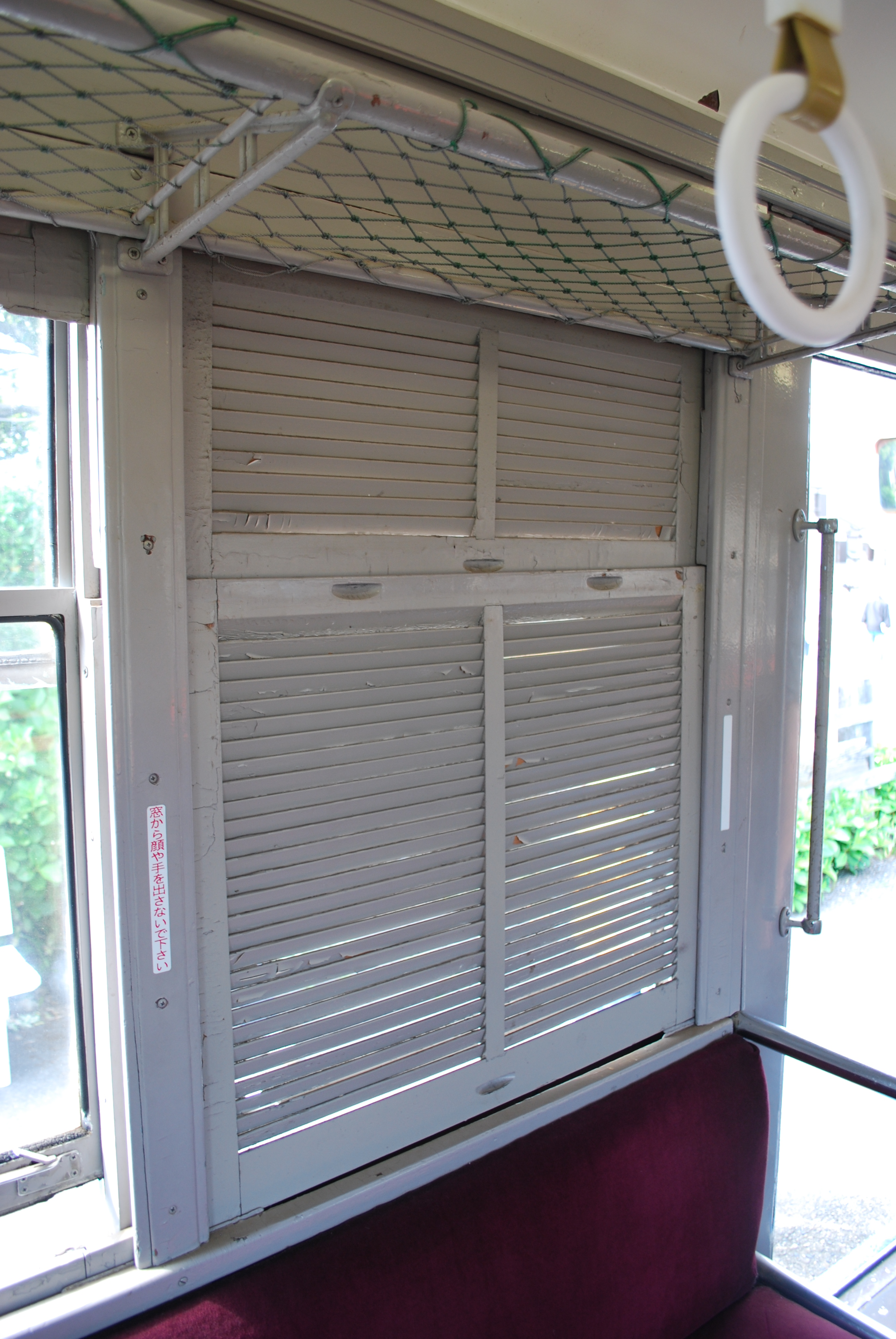
Wooden slat blinds in a 700 series car, May 2009

== History ==
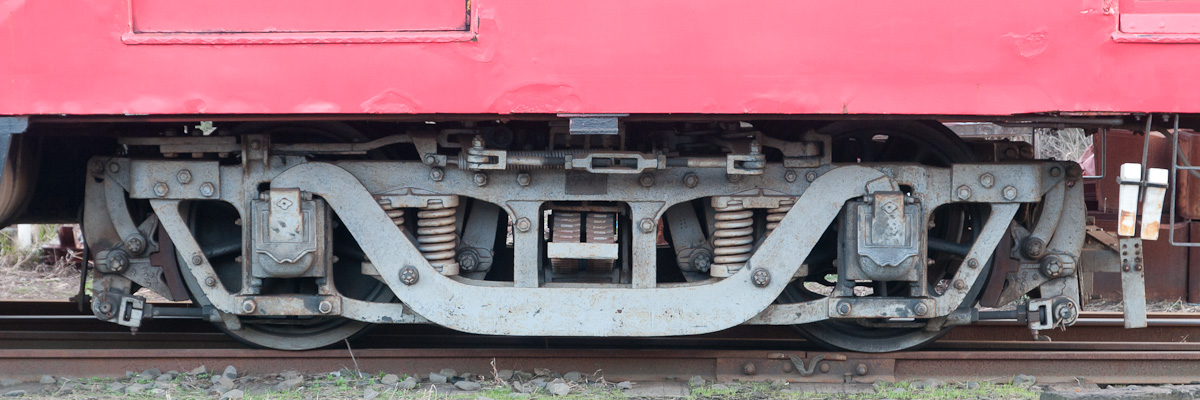
Sumitomo KS-33 bogie on DeHa 701, January 2010

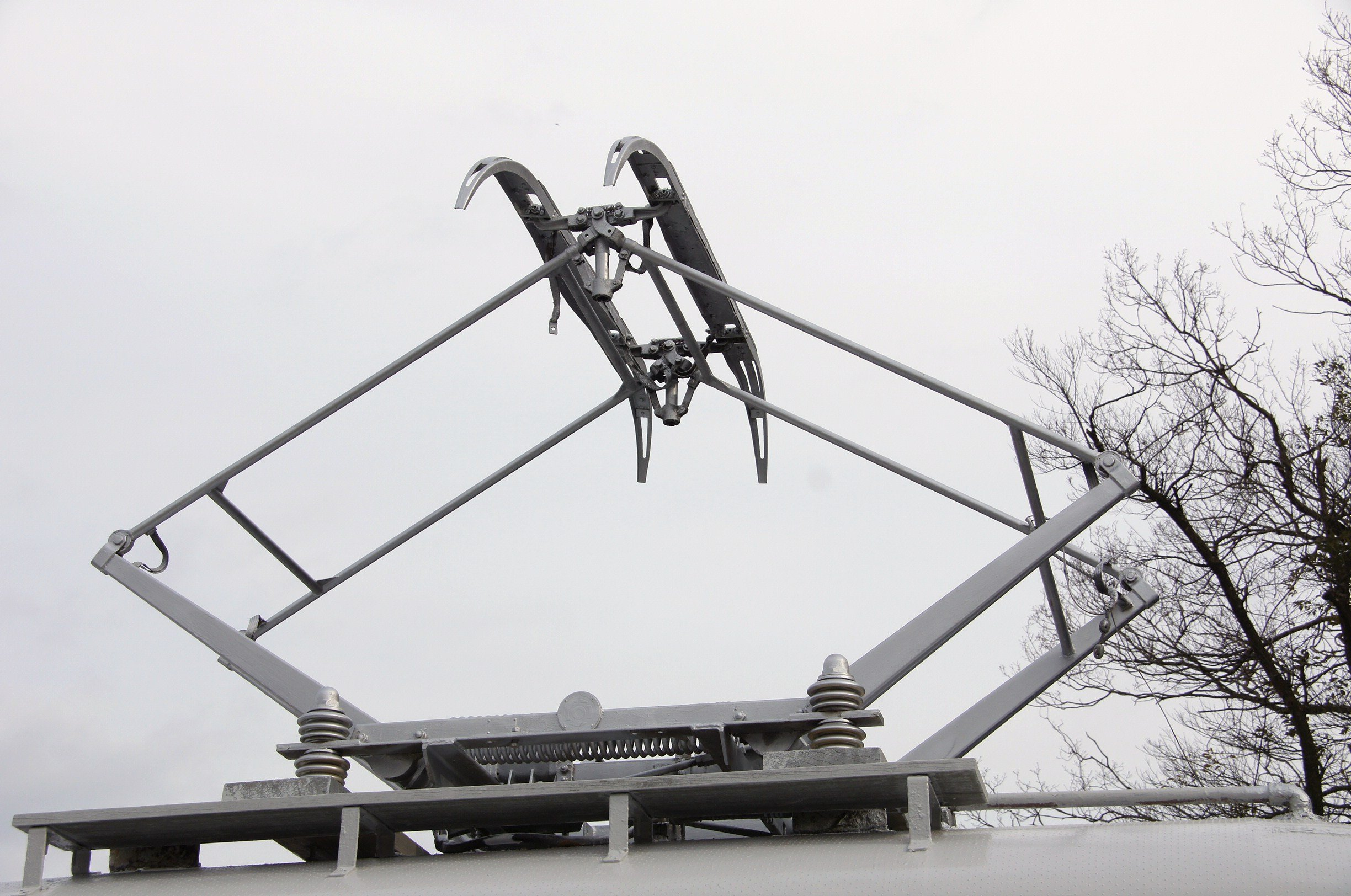
Lozenge-type pantograph on DeHa 702

Two 1942-vintage MoHa 50 EMU cars, MoHa 51 and MoHa 52, were purchased from Ohmi Railway, and were modified at Seibu Railway's workshops in Tokorozawa, Saitama in 1978, becoming DeHa 701 and DeHa 702 respectively. The MoHa 50 EMU cars themselves used the bogies and electrical equipment from former wooden-bodied DeYuWa 101 and 102 mail EMU cars built in March 1928 by Kawasaki Dockyard Co., Ltd. The MoHa 50 cars were originally built as single-cars, but had one cab end removed in 1961. The second cab ends were reinstated on conversion for use on the Choshi Electric Railway. The cars entered revenue service on the Choshi Electric Railway from 5 April 1978.

In 1981, Prince Akishino rode on both DeHa 701 and DeHa 702 with friends on a trip from Choshi to Tokawa on 6 December 1981 while he was studying at Gakushuin University in Tokyo.

In September 1990, both cars were repainted into the new standard livery of dark brown and red. DeHa 701 was repainted into a promotional yellow livery in June 1994, and "couple seats" were provided together with heart-shaped hanging straps in a tie-up with a TV Tokyo television programme. It was modified for driver only operation in December 1994.

On 24 June 1995, DeHa 701 was involved in a head-on collision north of Kasagami-Kurohae Station when it hit DeHa 1001 on an up (Chōshi-bound) service. Both cars sustained front-end damage. DeHa 701 was returned to service in April 1996 following repairs and repainting back into the new standard livery of dark brown and red.

In November 2007, DeHa 702 was repainted into the 1950s livery of sky blue and pale grey. This car was not modified for driver only operation, and was thus limited to use as a second car to lengthen busier services or for tour groups.

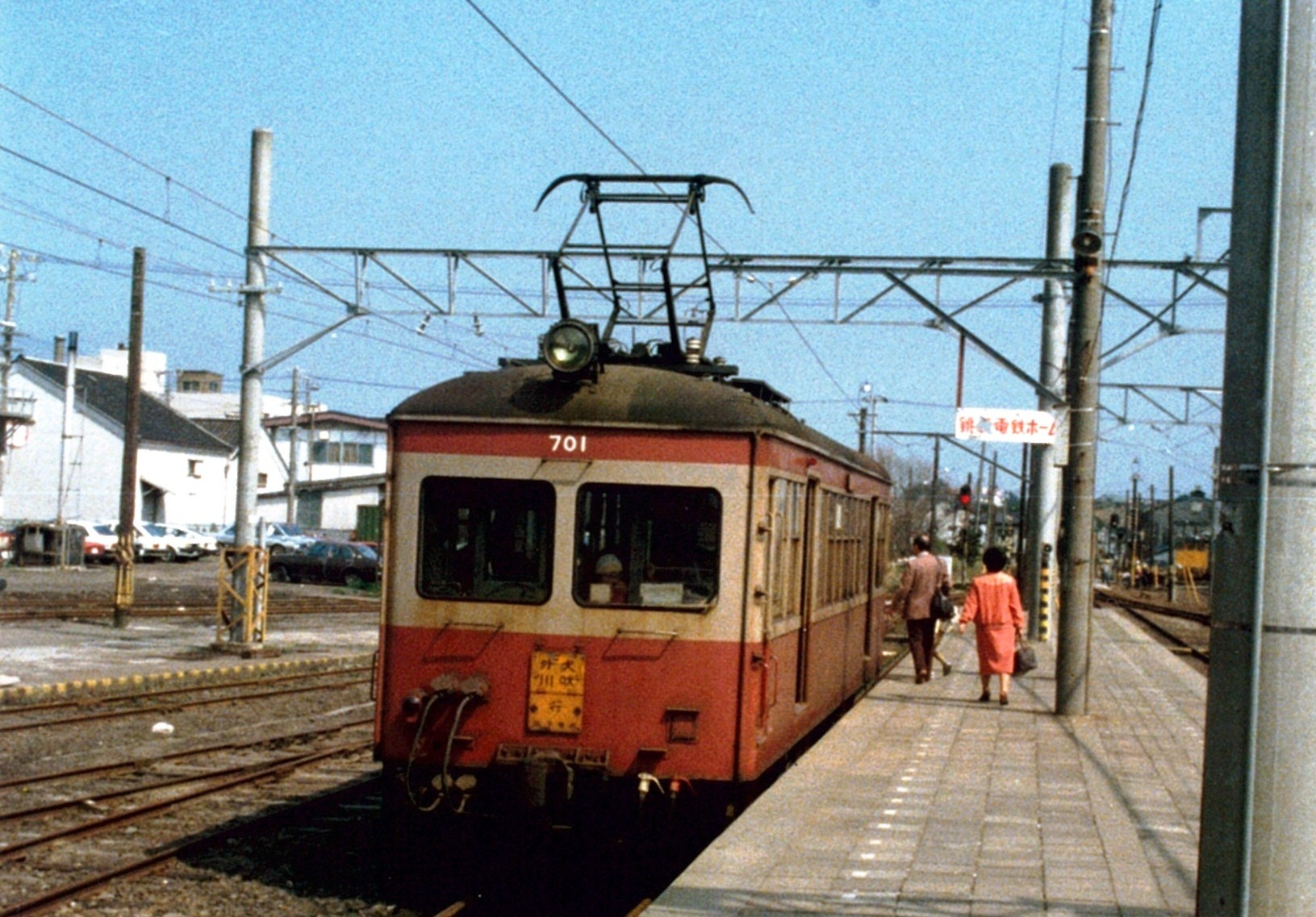
DeHa 701 in original livery, April 1983

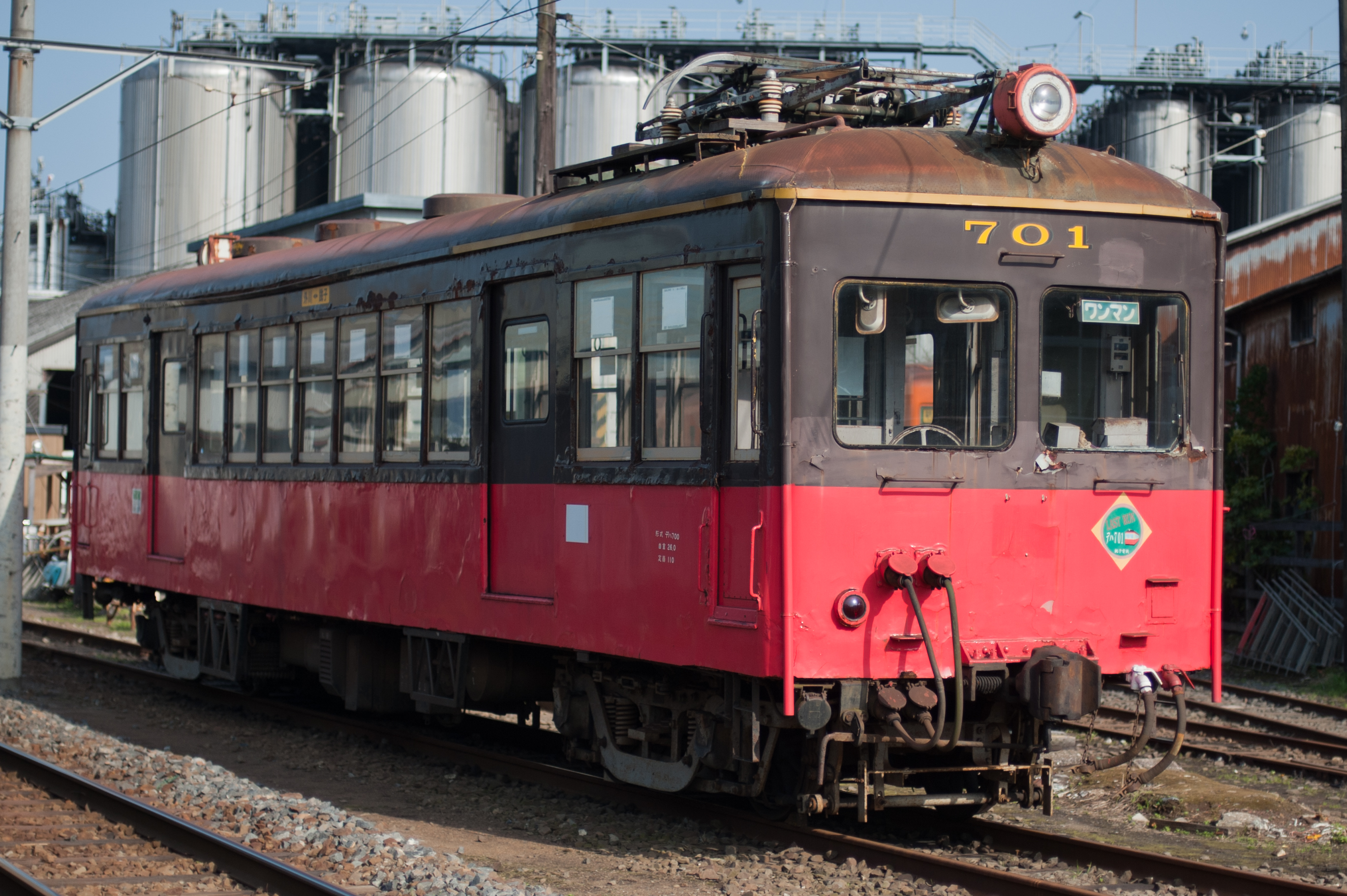
DeHa 701 in "new" Choshi Electric Railway livery, March 2010

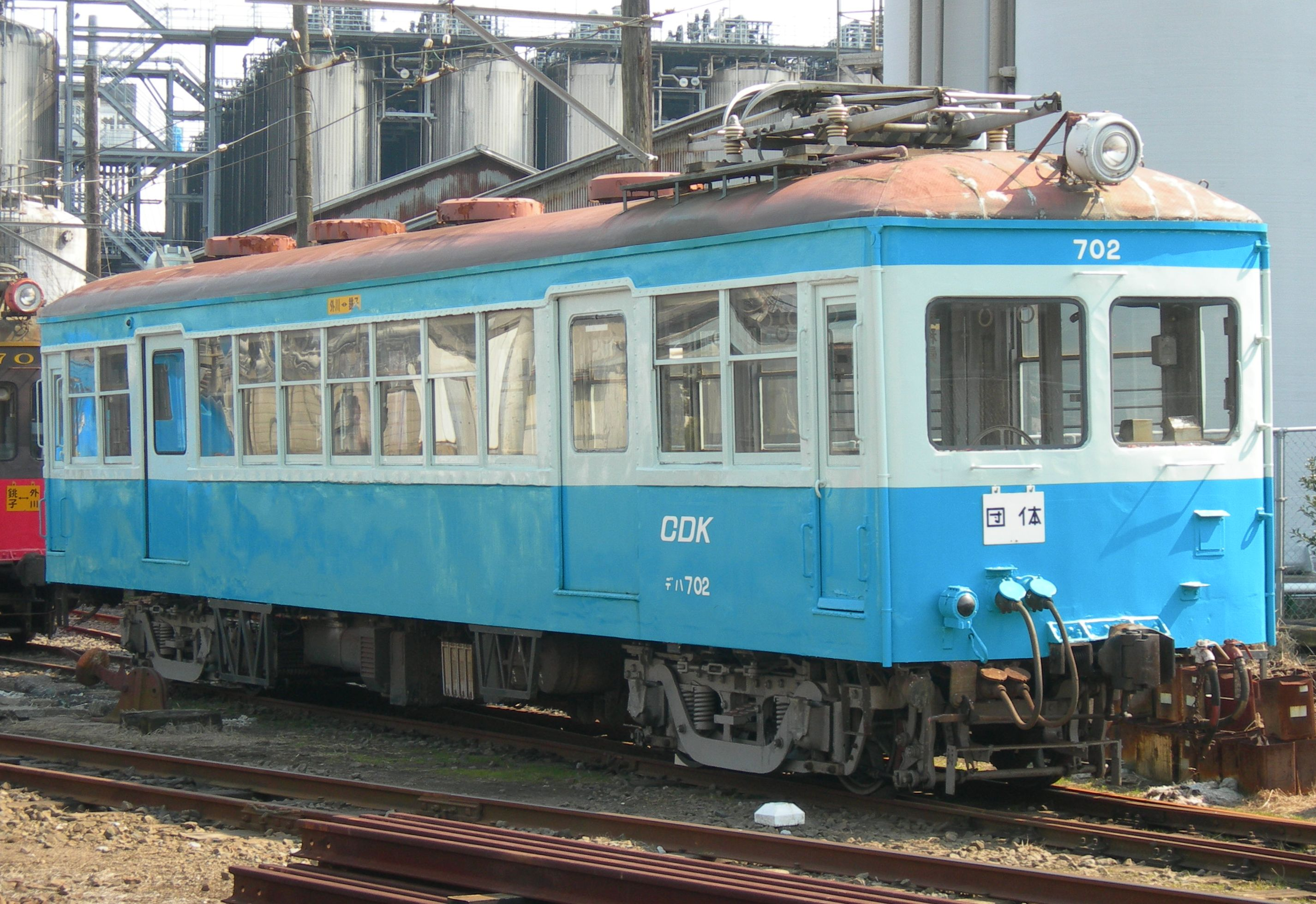
DeHa 702 in 1950s livery, March 2008

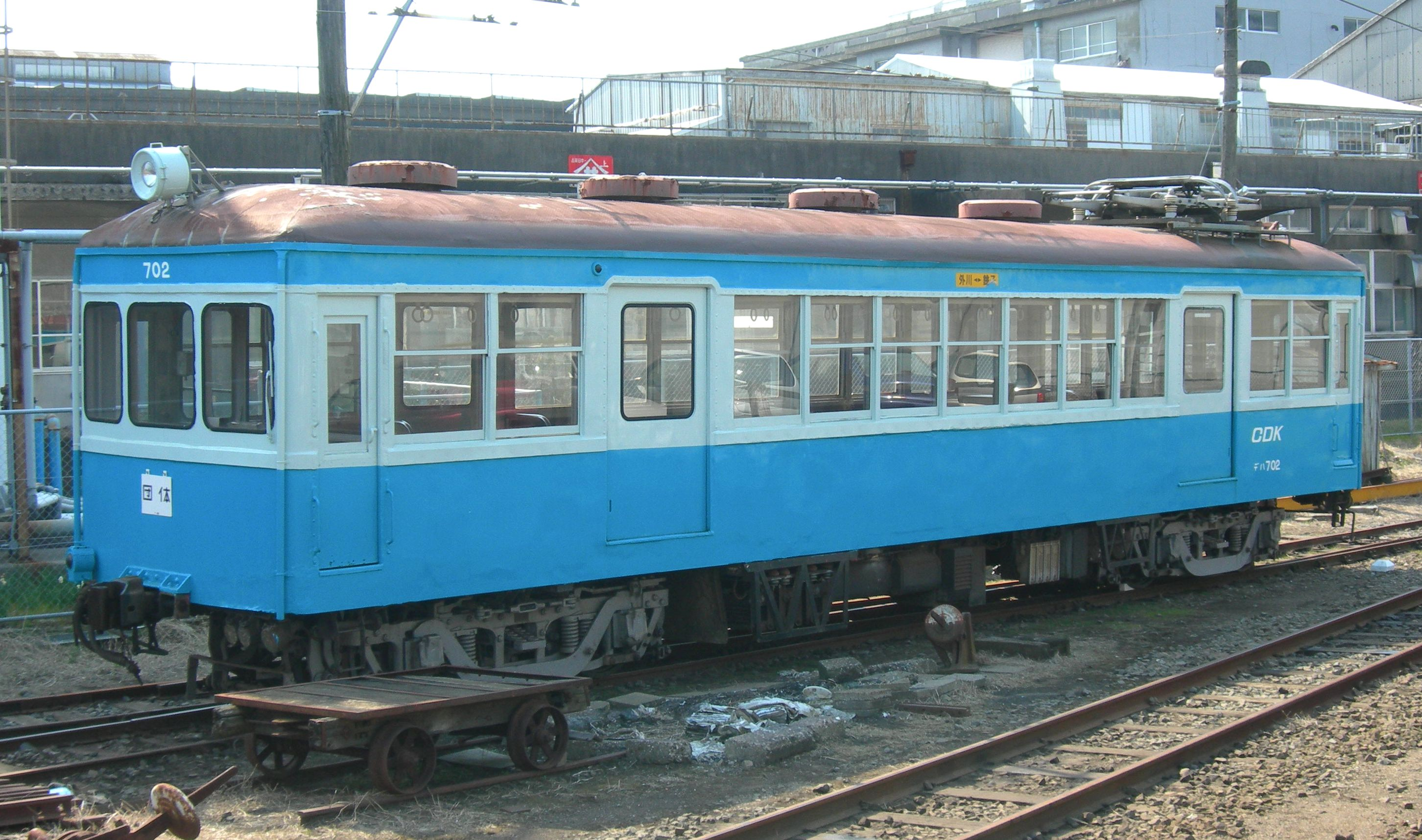
DeHa 702 in 1950s livery, March 2008

=== Withdrawal and preservation ===
DeHa 702 was withdrawn from service in January 2010, and DeHa 701 was withdrawn after its final day of operation on 23 September 2010.

In November 2011, the two cars were moved to the Isumi Poppo-no-oka farm shop in Isumi, Chiba, where they were restored and repainted for use as shop facilities selling local produce and souvenirs, open to the public from 16 December 2011.

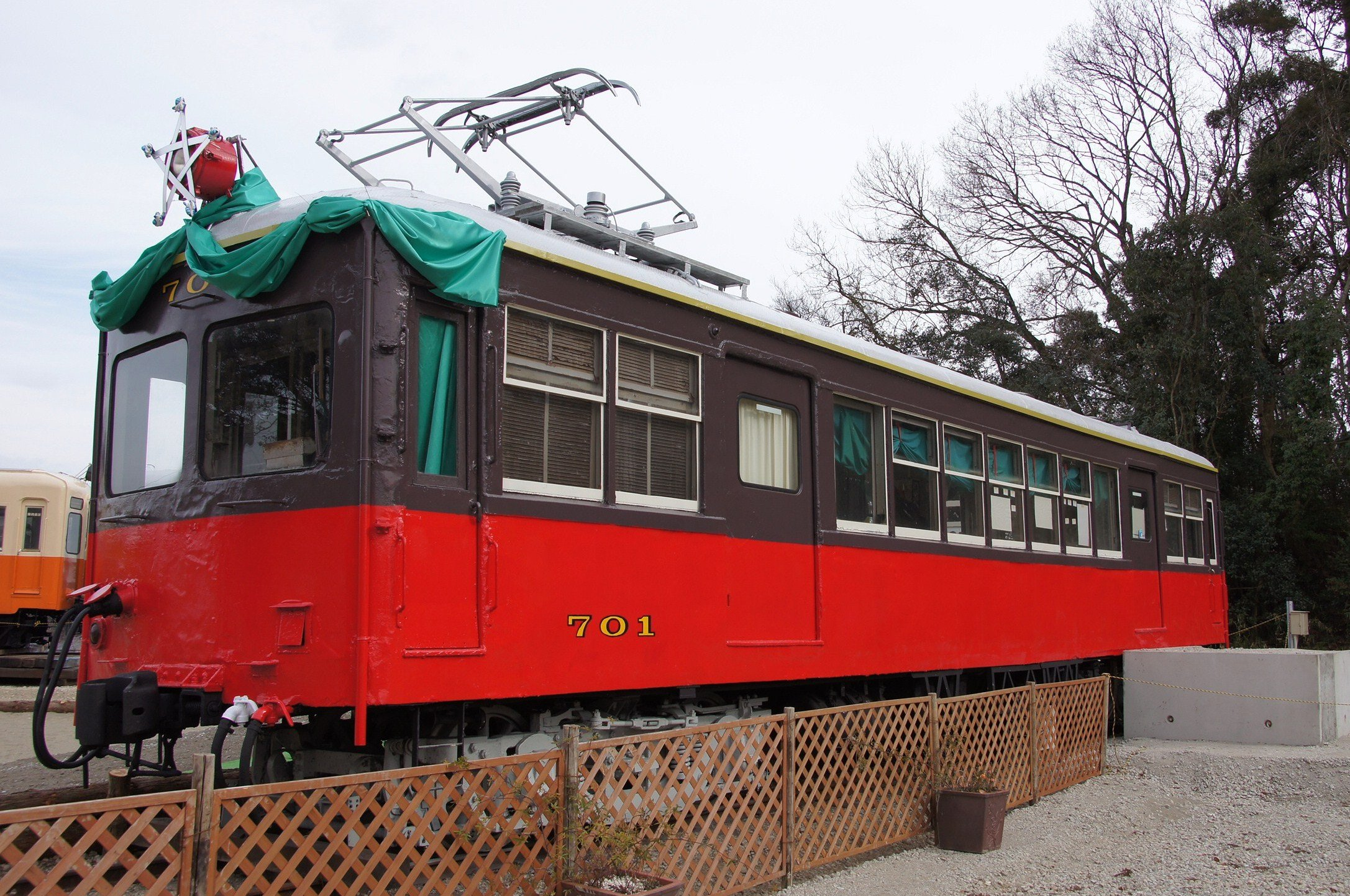
DeHa 701 preserved in Isumi, Chiba, January 2012

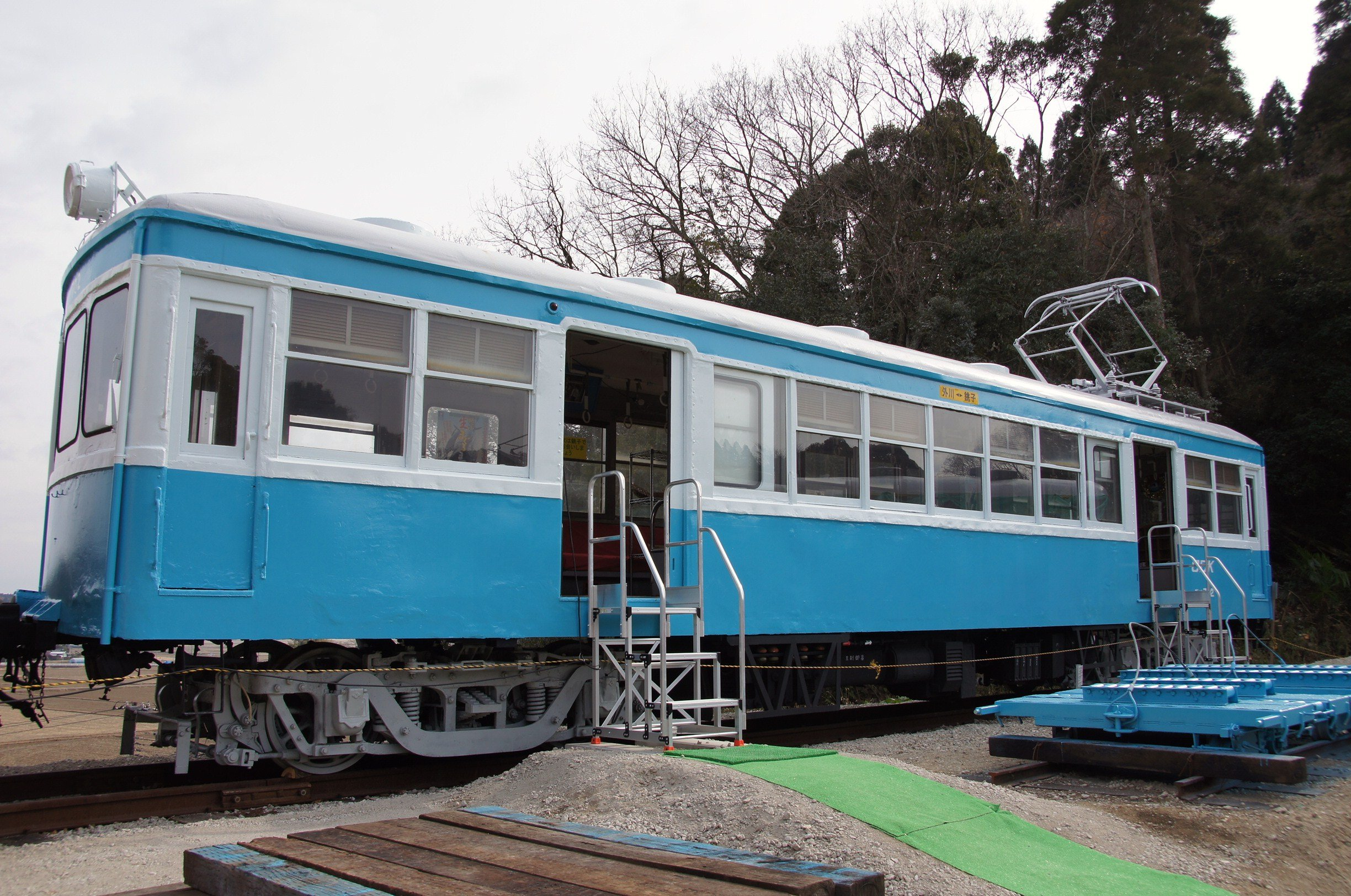
DeHa 702 preserved in Isumi, Chiba, January 2012
