= Ashikajima Station =

Railway station in Chōshi, Chiba Prefecture, Japan

Ashikajima Station 海鹿島駅
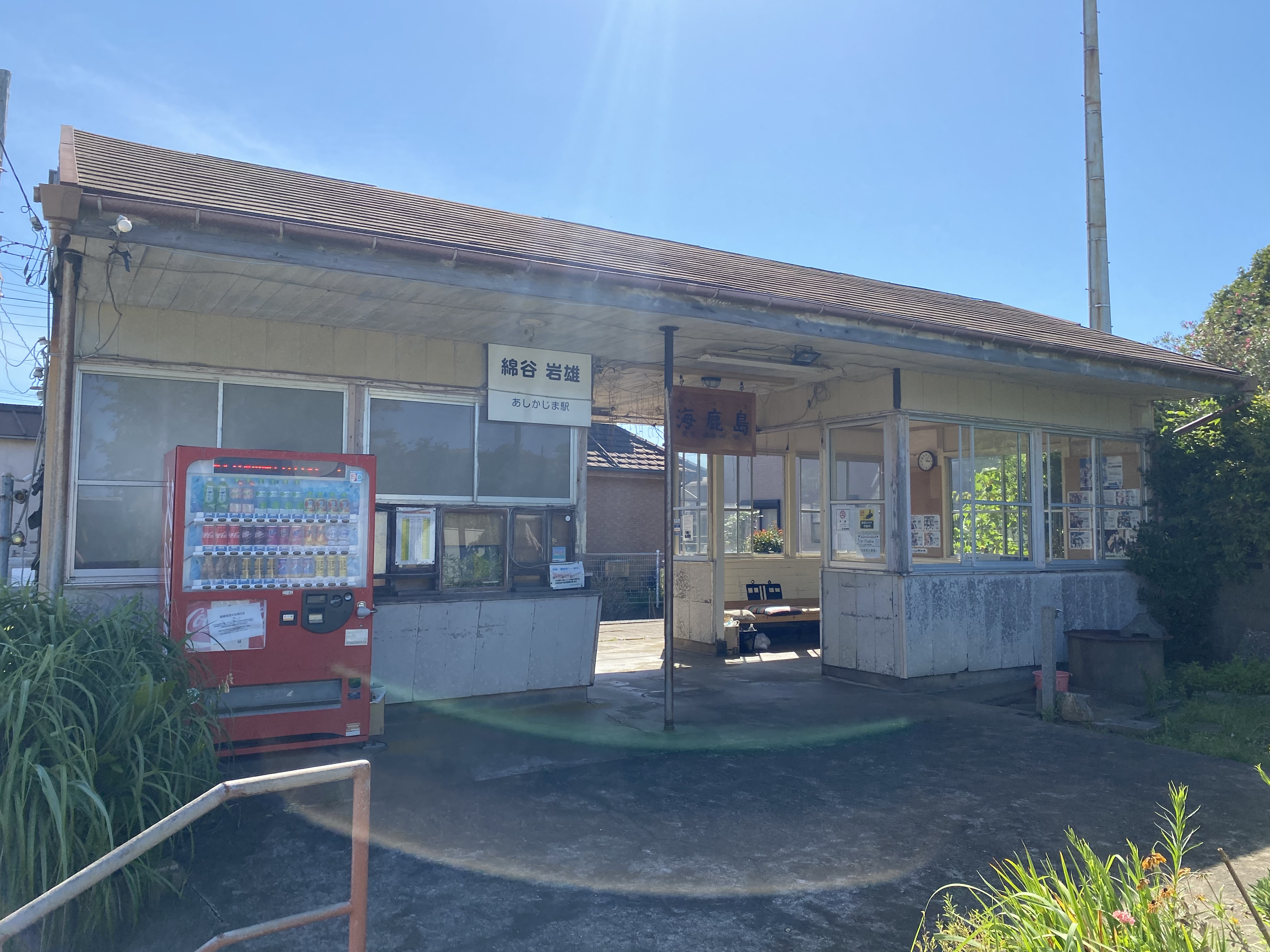
- The station entrance in July 2023

General information
- Location: 8505 Kobatake-shinmachi, Chōshi-shi, Chiba-ken 288-0021; Japan
- Coordinates: 35°43′18″N 140°51′49″E
- Operator: Choshi Electric Railway
- Line: Choshi Electric Railway Line
- Distance: 3.6 km from Chōshi
- Platforms: 1 (1 side platform)
- Tracks: 1

Construction
- Parking: No

Other information
- Status: Unstaffed
- Station code: CD07

History
- Opened: December 1913

Passengers
- FY2010: 147 daily

Services
Preceding station	Choshi Electric Railway	Following station
Nishi-Ashikajima towards Chōshi	Chōshi Electric Railway Line	Kimigahama towards Tokawa
Location
- Location within Chiba Prefecture Location within Japan

Ashikajima Station (海鹿島駅, Ashikajima-eki) is a railway station on the privately operated Chōshi Electric Railway Line in Chōshi, Chiba, Japan. The station is the easternmost station in the Kanto region, and a plaque erected in February 2012 stands on the station platform indicating this.

== Lines ==
Ashikajima Station is served by the 6.4-kilometre (4.0 mi) Chōshi Electric Railway Line from Chōshi to Tokawa. It is located between Nishi-Ashikajima and Kimigahama stations, and is a distance of 3.6 km (2.2 mi) from Chōshi Station.

== Station layout ==
The station is unstaffed, and consists of a side platform serving a single track.

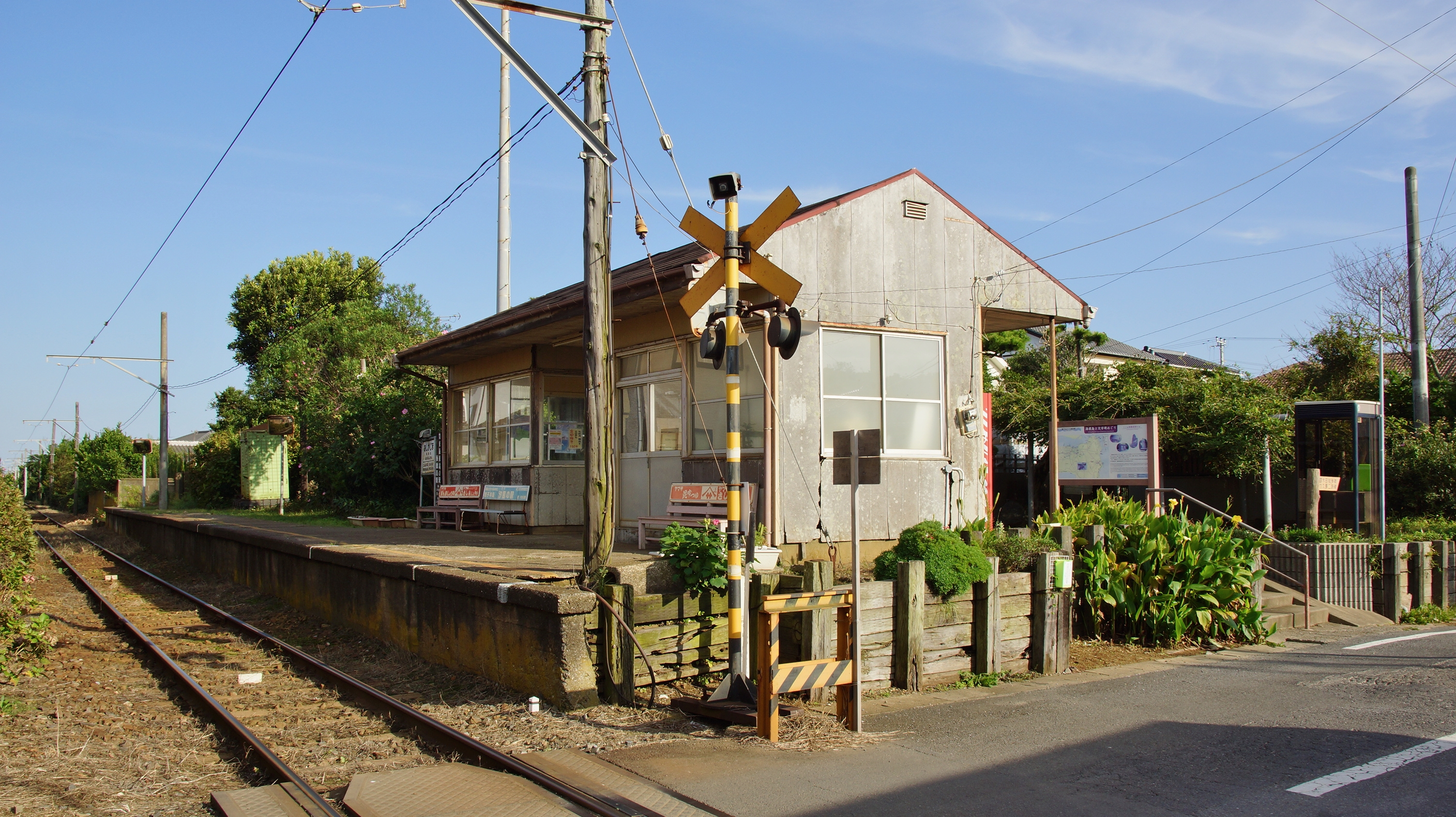
View of the station from the platform side in October 2015

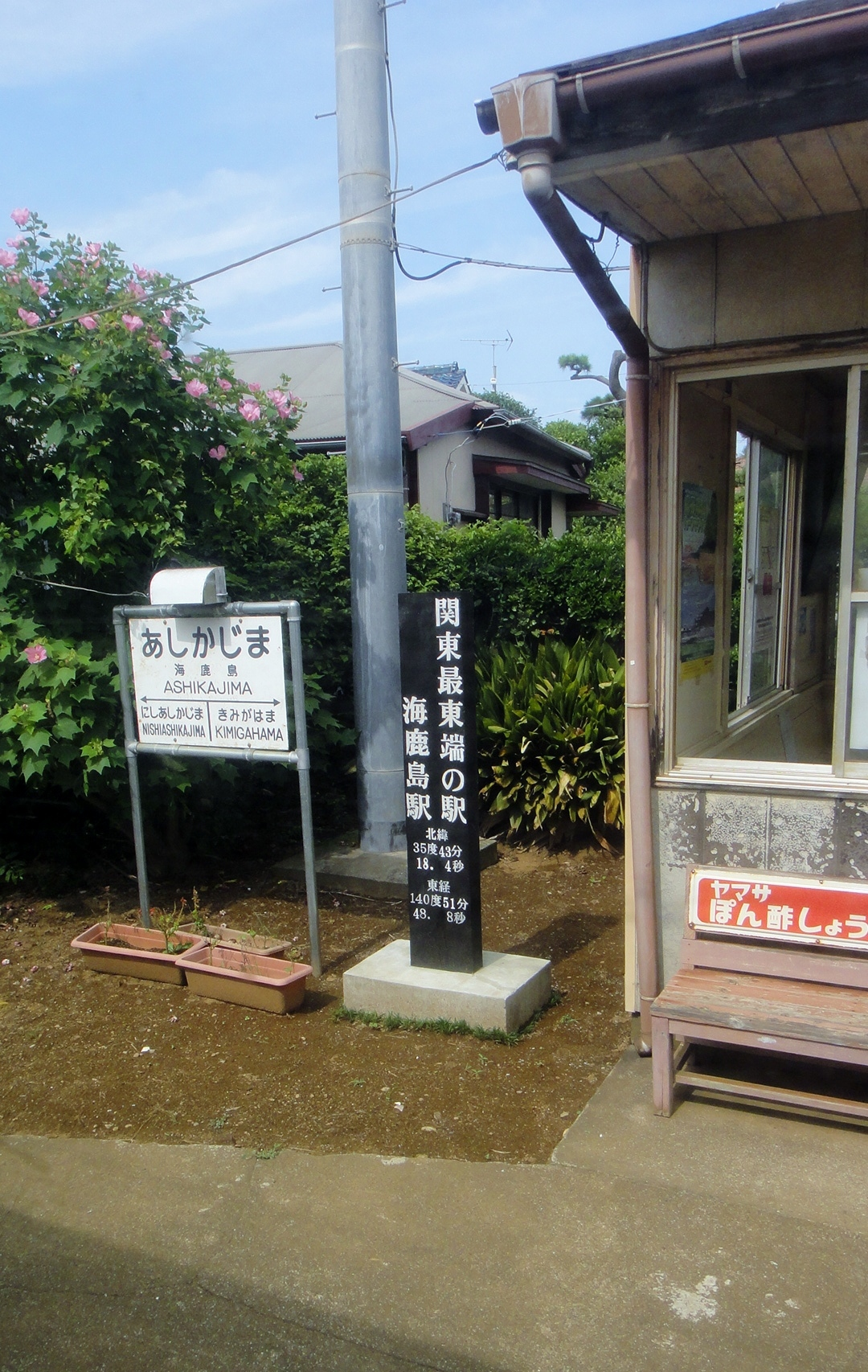
The plaque describing the station as the easternmost station in the Kanto Region

== History ==
Ashikajima Station first opened in December 1913 as a station on the Chōshi Sightseeing Railway (銚子遊覧鉄道, Chōshi Yūran Tetsudō), which operated a distance of 5.9 km (3.7 mi) between Chōshi and Inuboh. The railway closed in November 1917, but was reopened on 5 July 1923 as the Chōshi Railway. It was so named (literally "sea lion island") because of the large numbers of sea lions seen on the coast up until the 1950s. The present-day station structure was built in 1951.

Ashikajima became an unstaffed station from 1 January 2008.

== Passenger statistics ==
In fiscal 2010, the station was used by an average of 147 passengers daily (boarding passengers only). Passenger figures for previous years are as shown below.

Fiscal year	Daily average
1930	88
1950	442
1978	411
2007	151
2008	154
2009	161
2010	147

== Surrounding area ==
- Ashikajima beach

== See also ==
- List of railway stations in Japan
