= Kimigahama Station =

Railway station in Chōshi, Chiba Prefecture, Japan

Kimigahama Station 君ヶ浜駅
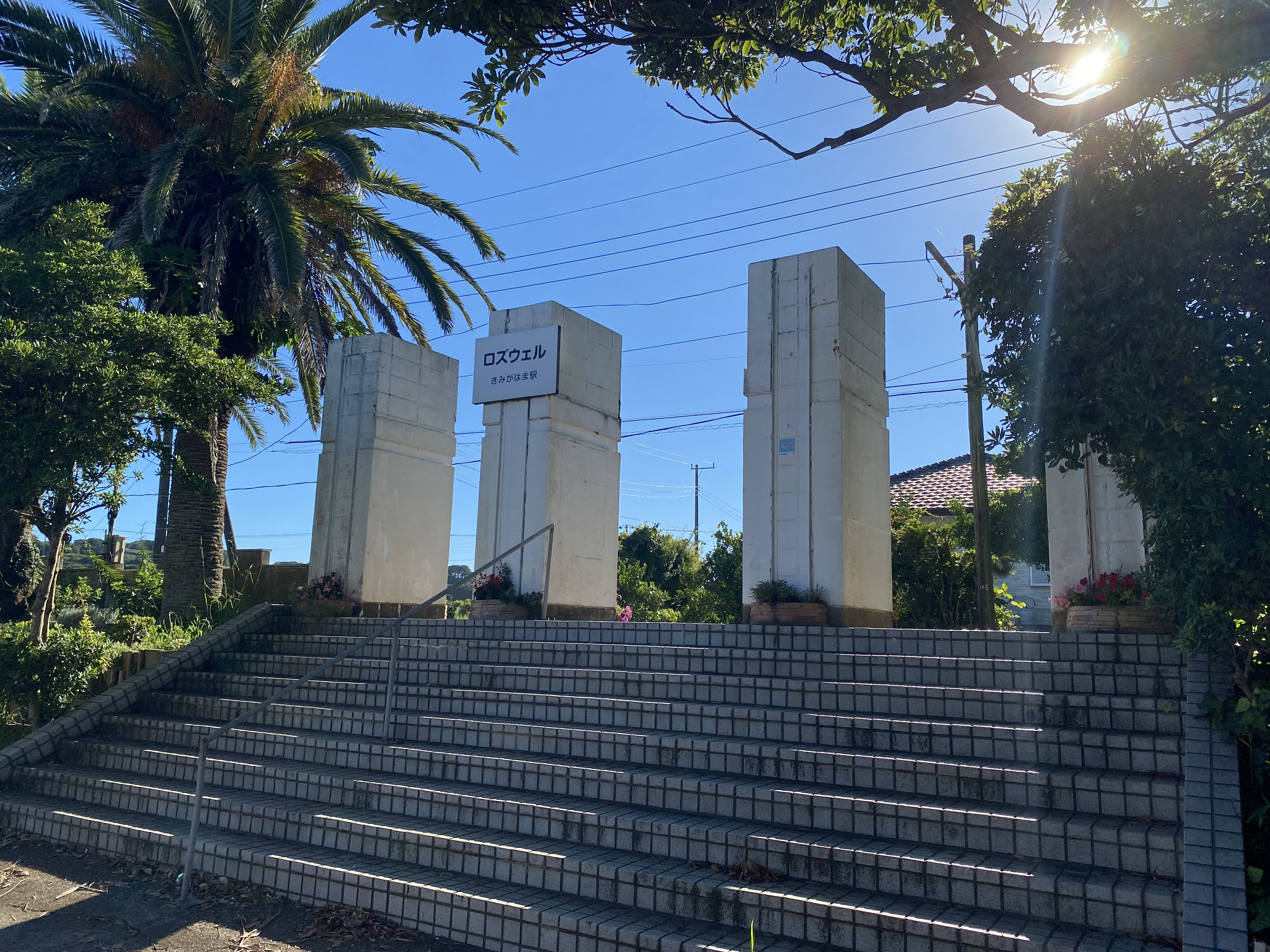
- The station entrance in August 2021

General information
- Location: 8987–4 Kimigahama, Chōshi-shi, Chiba-ken 288–0011; Japan
- Coordinates: 35°42′49″N 140°51′38″E
- Operator: Choshi Electric Railway
- Line: Choshi Electric Railway Line
- Distance: 4.7 km from Chōshi
- Platforms: 1 (1 side platform)
- Tracks: 1

Construction
- Parking: Yes

Other information
- Status: Unstaffed
- Station code: CD08

History
- Opened: 21 June 1931

Passengers
- FY2010: 16 daily

Services
Preceding station	Choshi Electric Railway	Following station
Ashikajima towards Chōshi	Chōshi Electric Railway Line	Inuboh towards Tokawa
Location
- Location within Chiba Prefecture Location within Japan

Kimigahama Station (君ヶ浜駅, Kimigahama-eki) is a railway station on the privately operated Chōshi Electric Railway Line in Chōshi, Chiba, Japan.

== Lines ==
Kimigahama Station is served by the 6.4 km (4.0 mi) Chōshi Electric Railway Line from Chōshi to Tokawa. It is located between Ashikajima and Inuboh stations, and is a distance of 4.7 km (2.9 mi) from Chōshi Station.

== Station layout ==
The station is unstaffed, and consists of a side platform serving a single track. There is no station building or shelter.

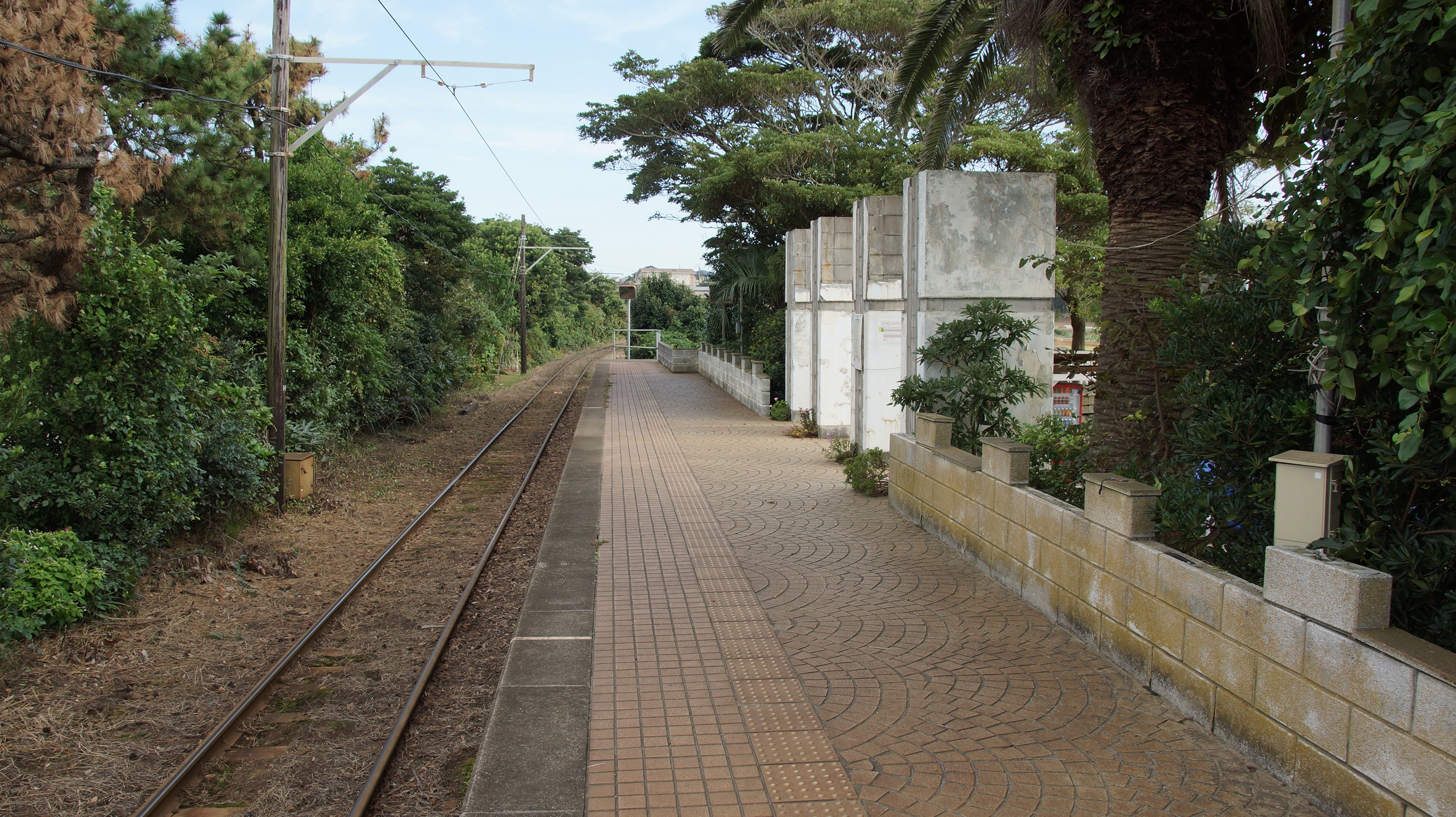
The platform looking north toward Choshi in October 2015

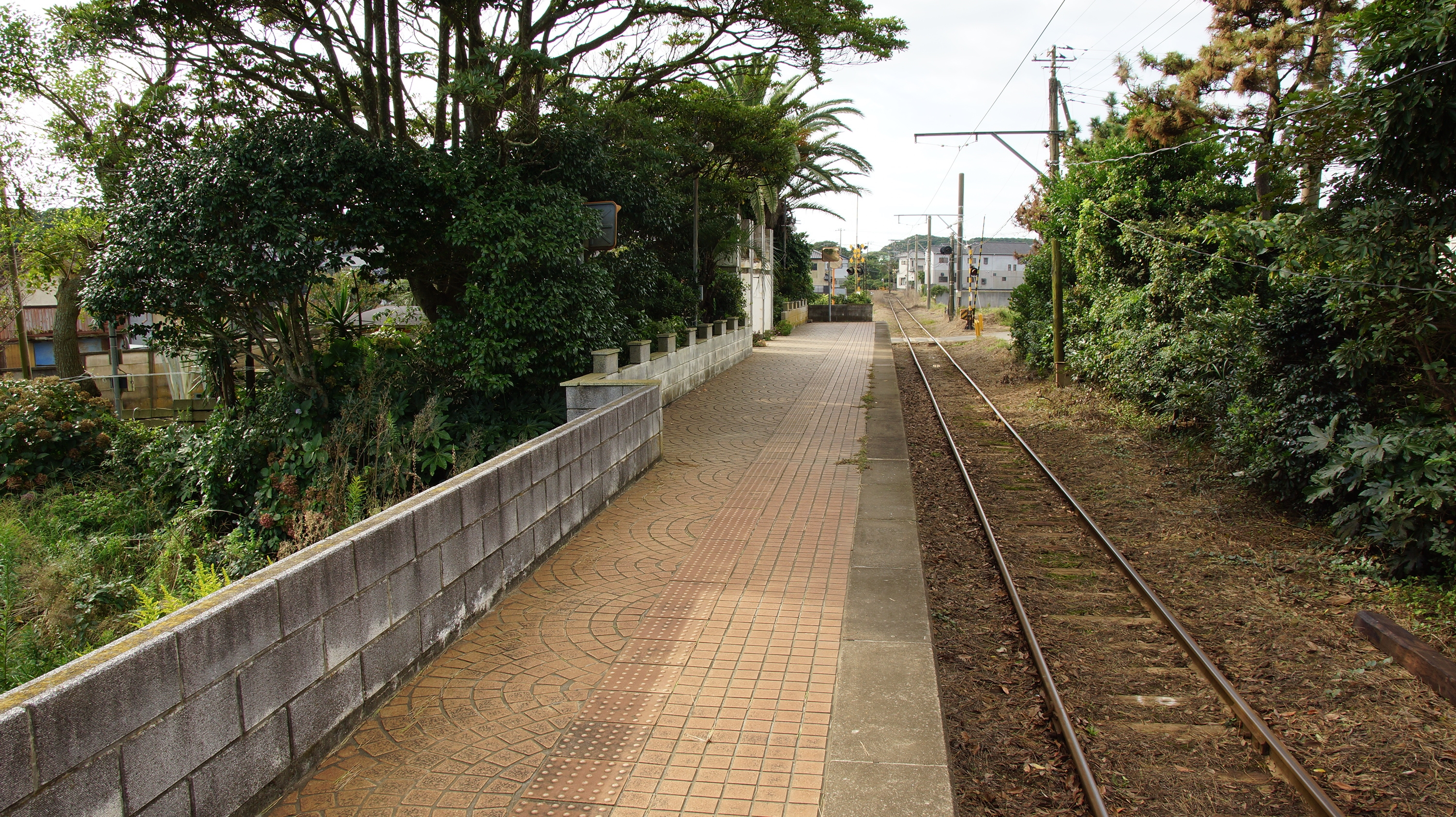
The platform looking south toward Tokawa in October 2015

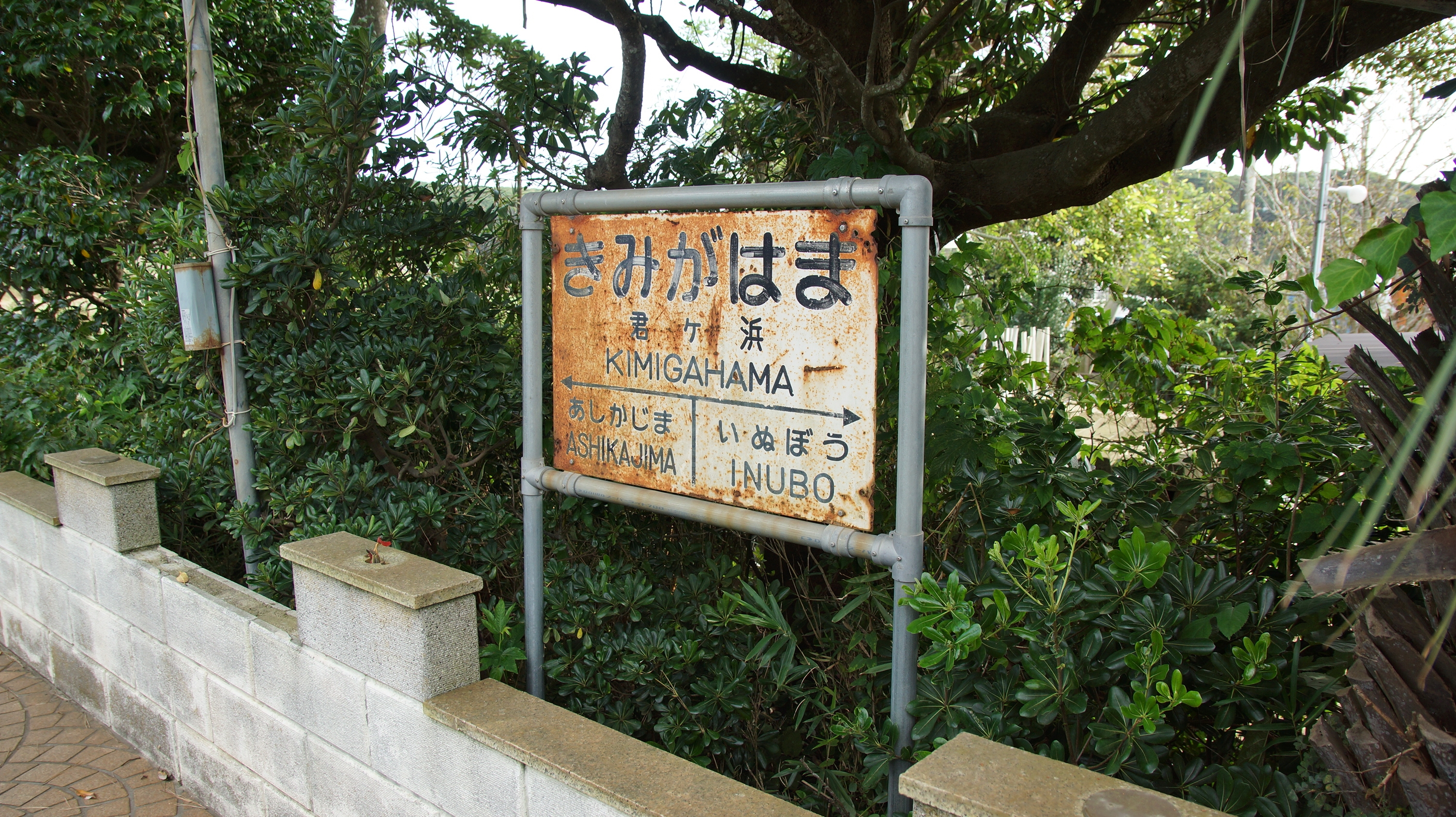
The station sign in October 2015

== History ==
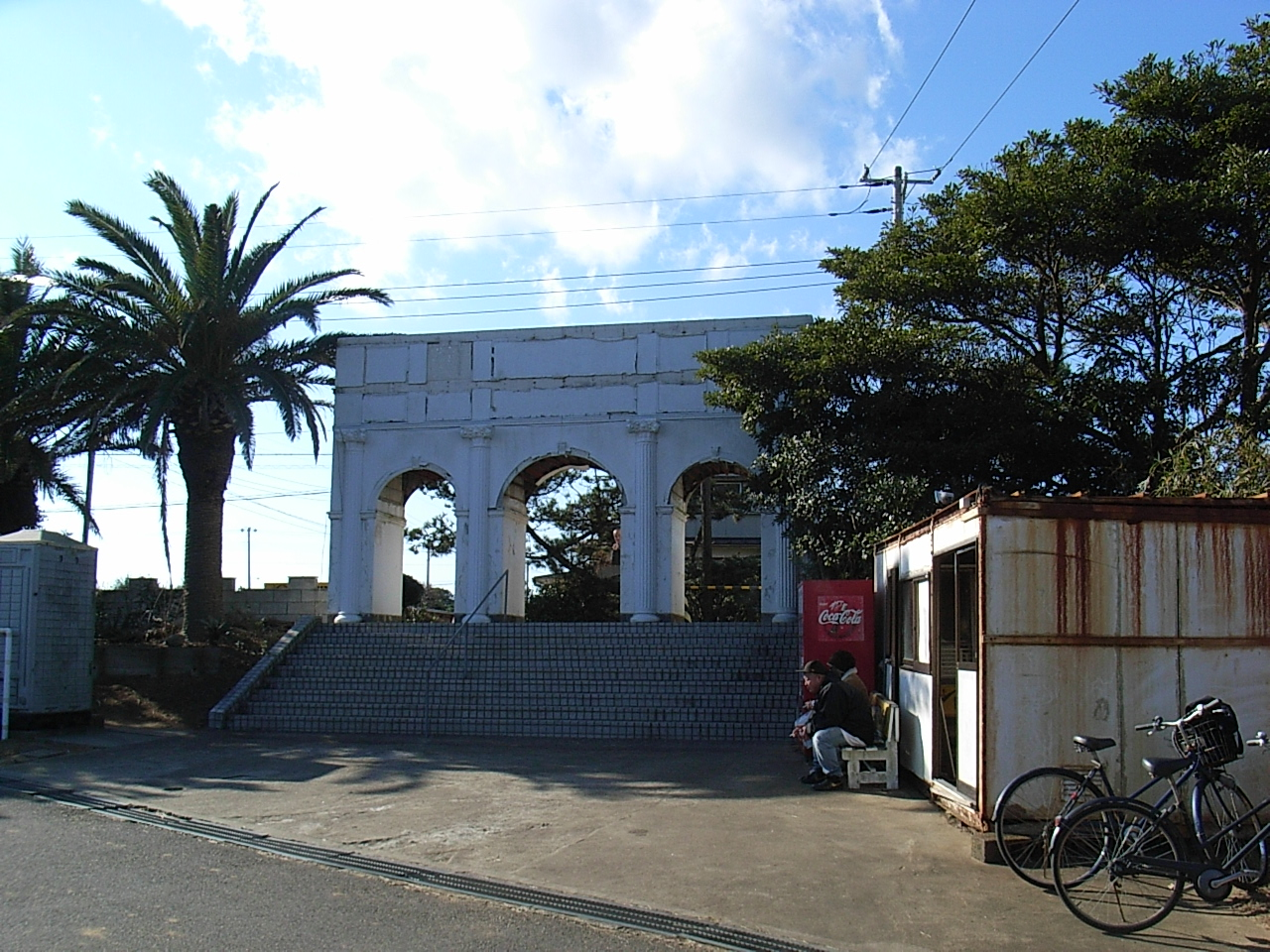
Kimigahama Station in January 2007, showing the Italian-style archway before dismantlement

Kimigahama Station opened on 21 June 1931. The original western-style station building fell into disrepair in the post-war years, and was eventually demolished, leaving just the platform. In December 1990, a white Italian-style archway was added, but this was partially demolished in February 2007, leaving just the bare pillars.

== Passenger statistics ==
In fiscal 2010, the station was used by an average of 16 passengers daily (boarding passengers only). The passenger figures for previous years are as shown below.

Fiscal year	Daily average
2007	17
2008	16
2009	18
2010	16

== Surrounding area ==
- Kimigahama beach
- Shiosai Park

== See also ==
- List of railway stations in Japan
