= Tomoshibi =

Tomoshibi may refer to:

- Tomoshibi (film), 2017 film
- "Tomoshibi", song by Casiopea from Active, 1992
