= Nishi-Ashikajima Station =

Railway station in Chōshi, Chiba Prefecture, Japan

Coordinates: 35°43′32″N 140°51′35″E

Nishi-Ashikajima Station 西海鹿島駅
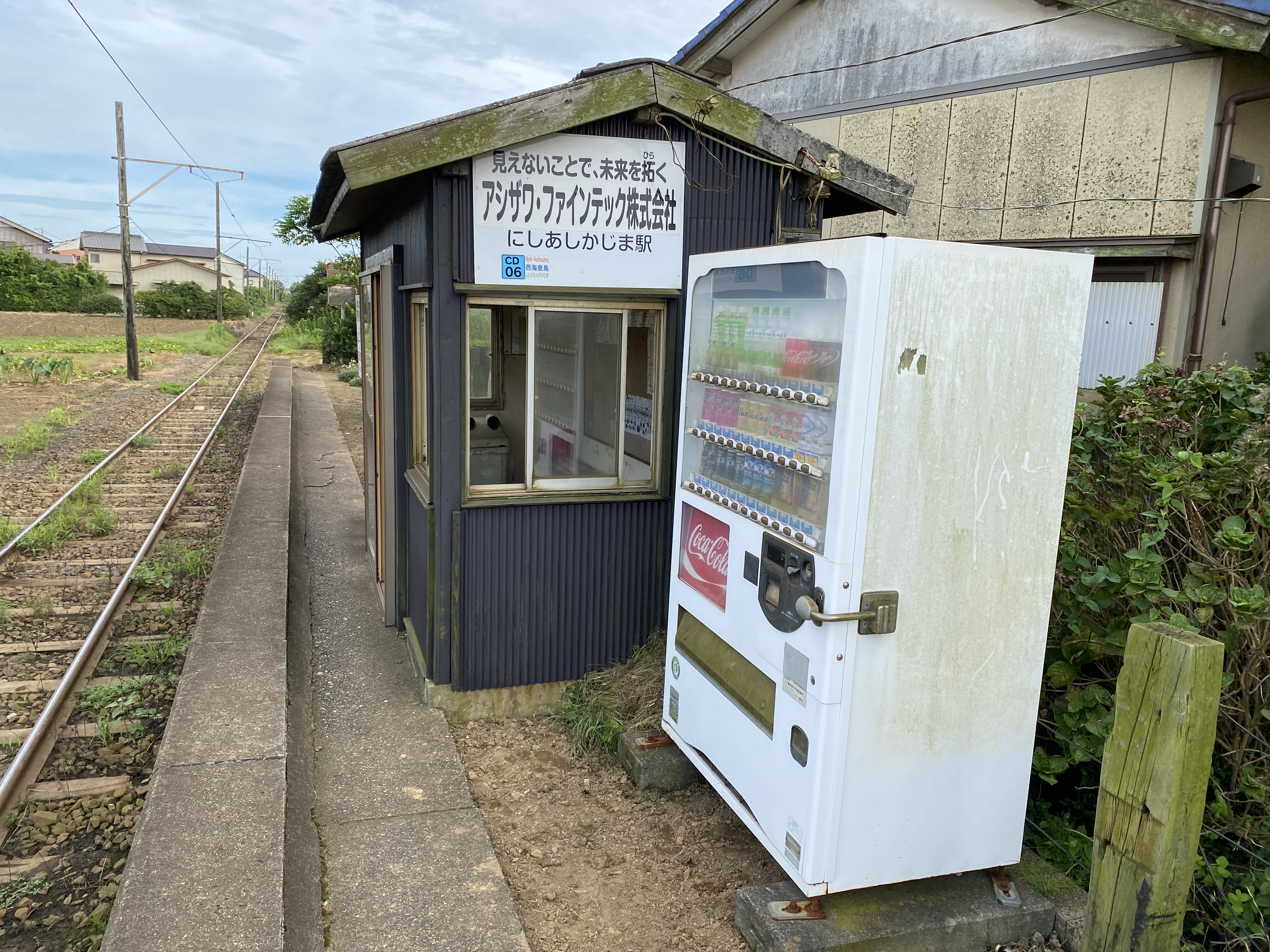
- Nishi-Ashikajima Station in August 2021

General information
- Location: 5212 Ashikajima-chō, Chōshi-shi, Chiba-ken; Japan
- Operator: Chōshi Electric Railway
- Line: Chōshi Electric Railway Line
- Distance: 3.2 km from Chōshi
- Platforms: 1 (1 side platform)
- Tracks: 1

Other information
- Status: Unstaffed
- Station code: CD06

History
- Opened: 1 May 1970

Passengers
- FY2010: 40 daily

Services
Preceding station	Choshi Electric Railway	Following station
Kasagami-Kurohae towards Chōshi	Chōshi Electric Railway Line	Ashikajima towards Tokawa
Location
- Location within Chiba Prefecture Location within Japan

Nishi-Ashikajima Station (西海鹿島駅, Nishi-Ashikajima-eki; lit. "West Ashikajima Station") is a railway station on the privately operated Chōshi Electric Railway Line in Chōshi, Chiba, Japan.

== Lines ==
Nishi-Ashikajima Station is served by the 6.4 km (4.0 mi) Chōshi Electric Railway Line from Chōshi to Tokawa. It is located between Kasagami-Kurohae and Ashikajima stations, and is a distance of 3.2 km (2.0 mi) from Chōshi Station.

== Station layout ==
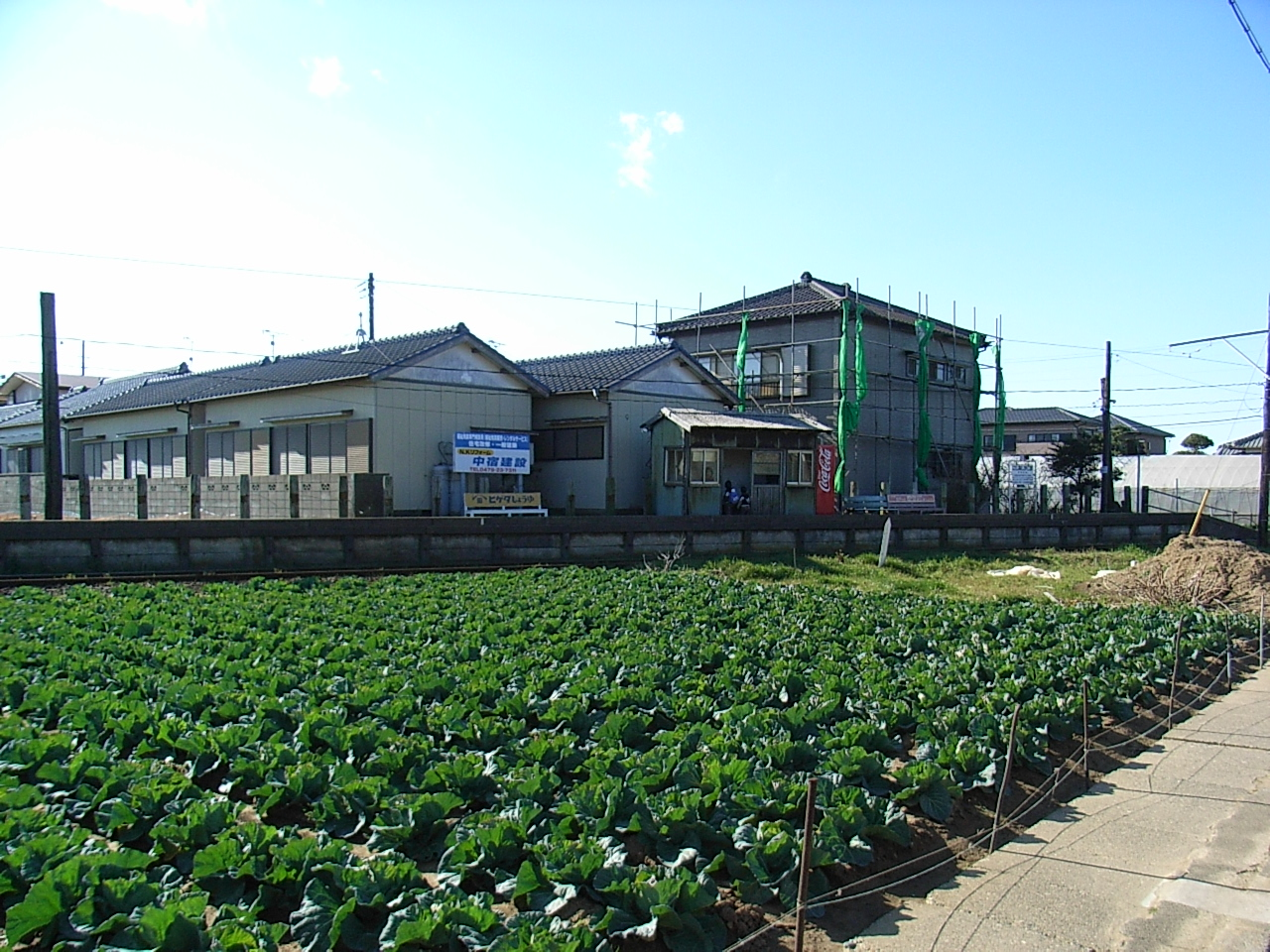
View of the station in January 2007

The station is unstaffed, and consists of a side platform serving a single track.

== History ==
Nishi-Ashikajima Station opened on 1 March 1970 to serve the surrounding residential area.

== Passenger statistics ==
In fiscal 2010, the station was used by an average of 40 passengers daily (boarding passengers only). The passenger figures for previous years are as shown below.

Fiscal year	Daily average
2007	55
2008	51
2009	45
2010	40

== See also ==
- List of railway stations in Japan
