= Inuboh Station =

Railway station in Chōshi, Chiba Prefecture, Japan

Inuboh Station 犬吠駅
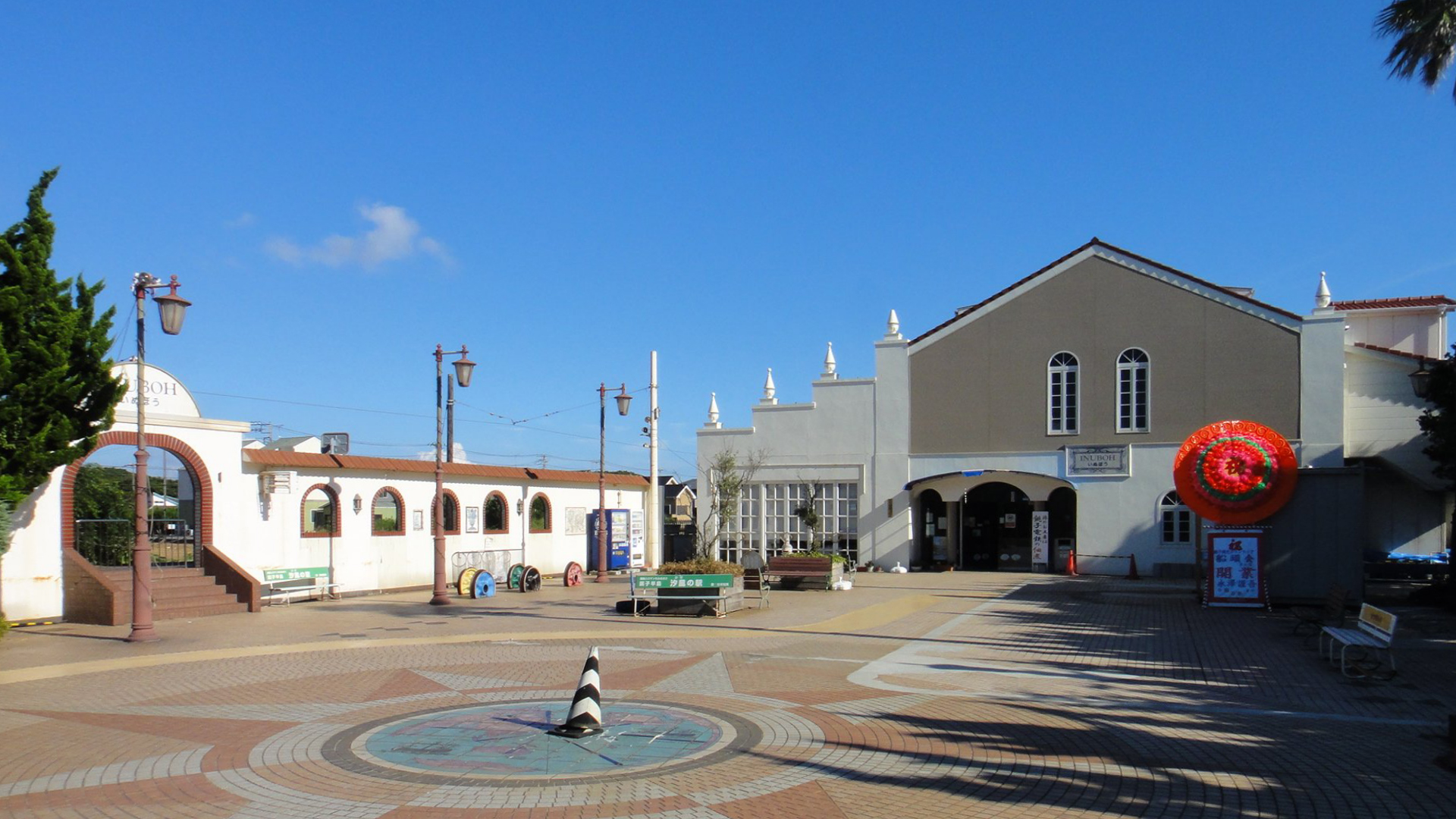
- Inuboh Station forecourt in August 2012

General information
- Location: 9591–1 Inubōzaki, Chōshi-shi, Chiba-ken; Japan
- Coordinates: 35°42′23″N 140°51′40″E
- Operator: Chōshi Electric Railway
- Line: Chōshi Electric Railway Line
- Distance: 5.5 km from Chōshi
- Platforms: 1 (1 side platform)
- Tracks: 1

Other information
- Station code: CD09

History
- Opened: December 1913
- Former names: Tōdaimae (until 1941)

Passengers
- FY2010: 158 daily

Services
Preceding station	Choshi Electric Railway	Following station
Kimigahama towards Chōshi	Chōshi Electric Railway Line	Tokawa Terminus
Location
- Location within Chiba Prefecture Location within Japan

Inuboh Station (犬吠駅, Inubō-eki) is a railway station on the privately operated Chōshi Electric Railway Line in Chōshi, Chiba, Japan.

== Lines ==
Inuboh Station is served by the 6.4 km (4.0 mi) Chōshi Electric Railway Line from Chōshi to Tokawa. It is located between Kimigahama and Tokawa stations, and is a distance of 5.5 km from Chōshi Station.

== Station layout ==
The station is staffed during the daytime, and consists of one side platform serving a single track. Nure senbei (moist senbei rice crackers) are made and sold inside the large Portuguese-style station building.

Former Choshi Electric Railway DeHa 501 EMU car was sectioned and grounded in front of the station together with former Sagami Railway 2000 series EMU car MoNi 2022. These were used as shop and restaurant facilities until they were cut up on-site in July 2012 due to their increasingly poor structural condition.

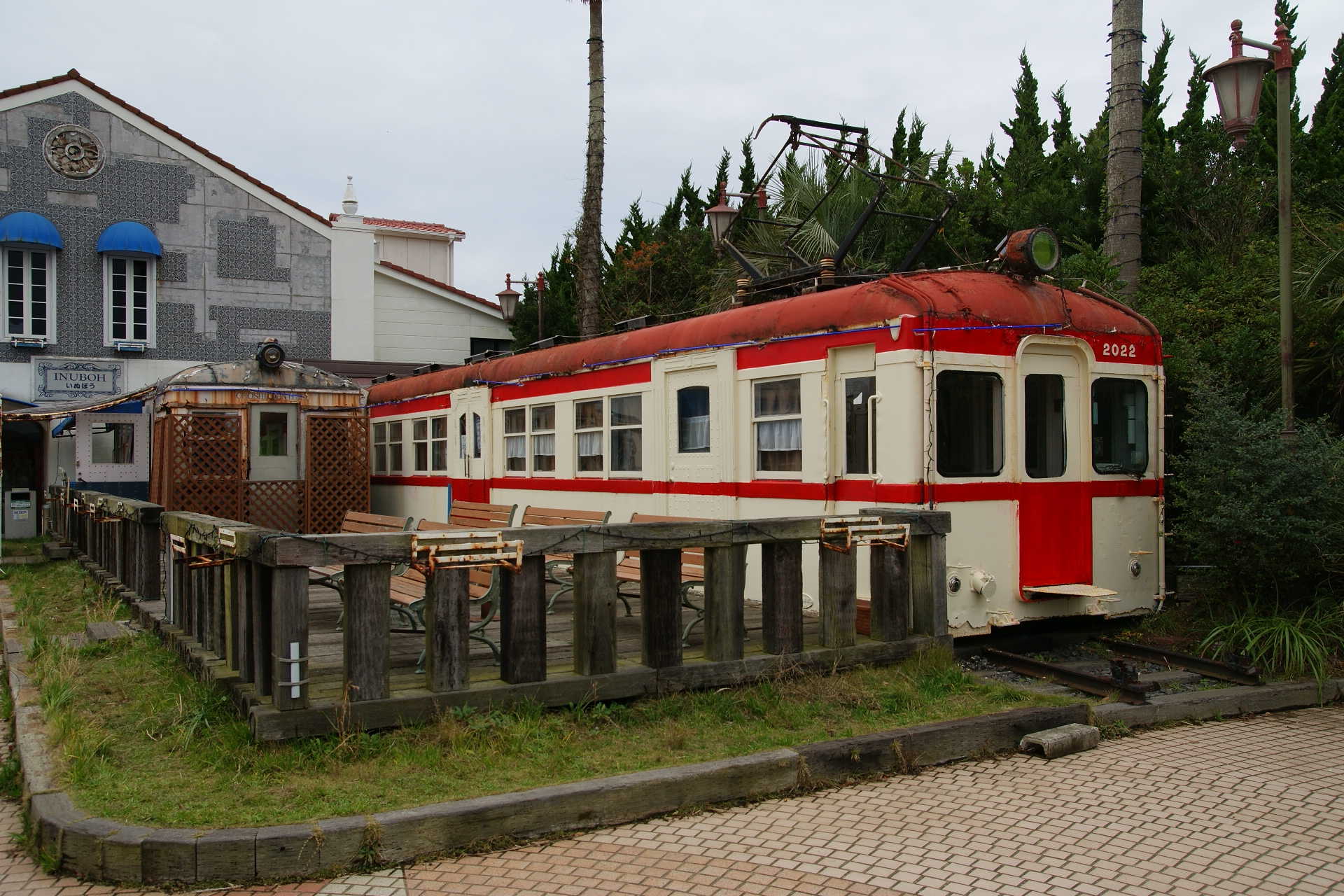
Former DeHa 501 car (left) and Sagami Railway MoNi 2022 car (right) in front of the station in November 2009

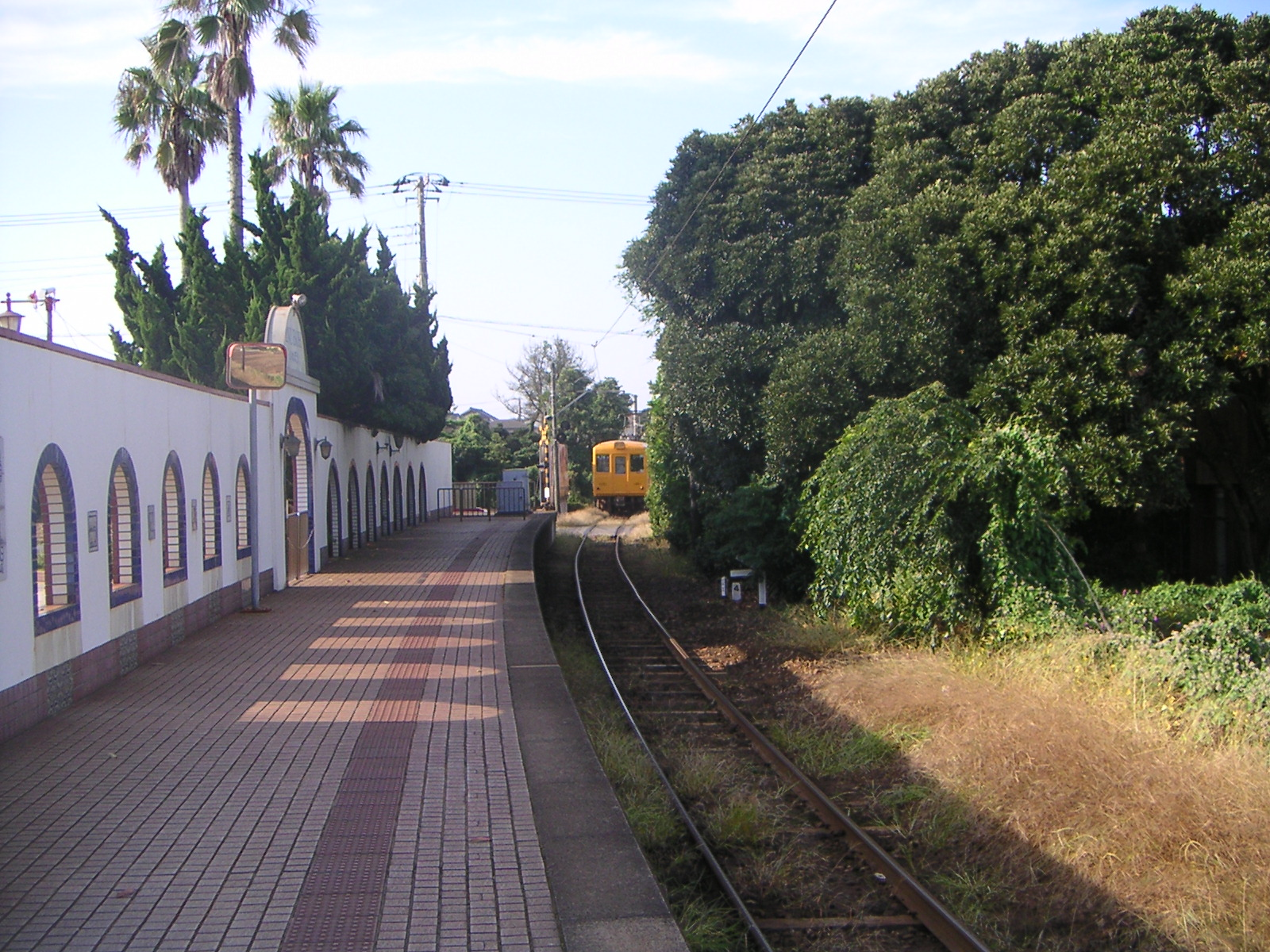
The platform looking southward toward Tokawa in September 2012

== History ==
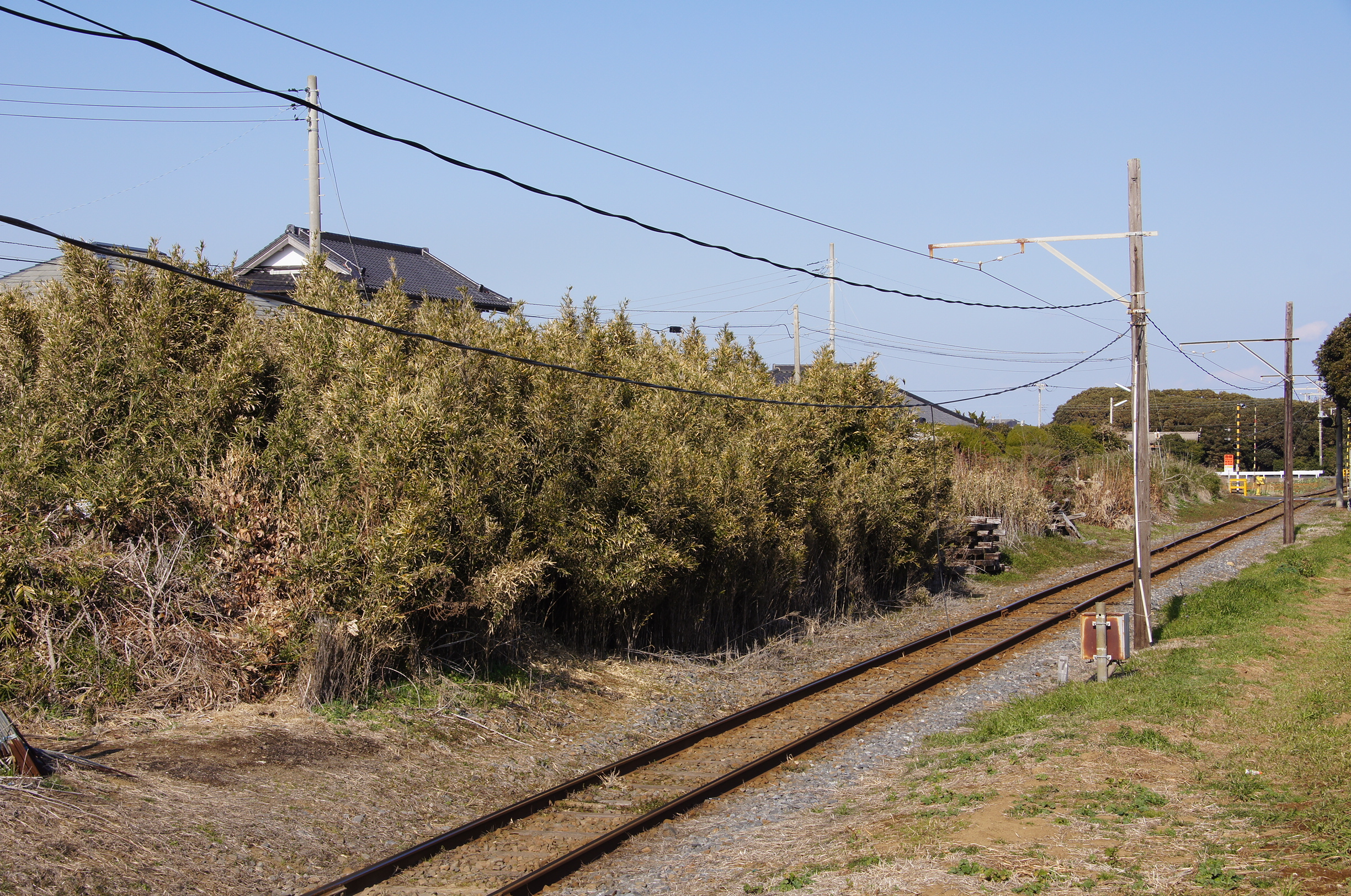
Site of the original Inuboh Station, now used for storing sleepers, January 2012

Inuboh Station first opened in December 1913 as a station on the Chōshi Sightseeing Railway (銚子遊覧鉄道, Chōshi Yūran Tetsudō), which operated a distance of 5.9 km between Chōshi and Inuboh. The railway closed in November 1917, but was reopened on 5 July 1923 as the Chōshi Railway. The original station was located 400 m south of the location of the present-day Inuboh Station. On 21 June 1935, a new temporary station opened at the present-day station of Inuboh Station, named Tōdaimae Station (燈台前駅; lit. "lighthouse front"). This became a full-time station from 14 August 1935. With the opening of Tōdaimae Station, passenger usage of the original Inuboh Station dropped from an average of 30 passengers daily in 1930 to an average of just 13 passengers daily. The original Inuboh Station closed from 15 November 1941, from which date Tōdaimae Station was renamed Inuboh. The original station structure included a roof extending over the platform, but this was damaged by a typhoon in September 1948, and not replaced. A new Portuguese-style station building was completed in December 1990 with a large forecourt area for special events.

== Passenger statistics ==
In fiscal 2010, the station was used by an average of 158 passengers daily (boarding passengers only). The passenger figures for previous years are as shown below.

Fiscal year	Daily average
2007	304
2008	238
2009	197
2010	158

== Surrounding area ==
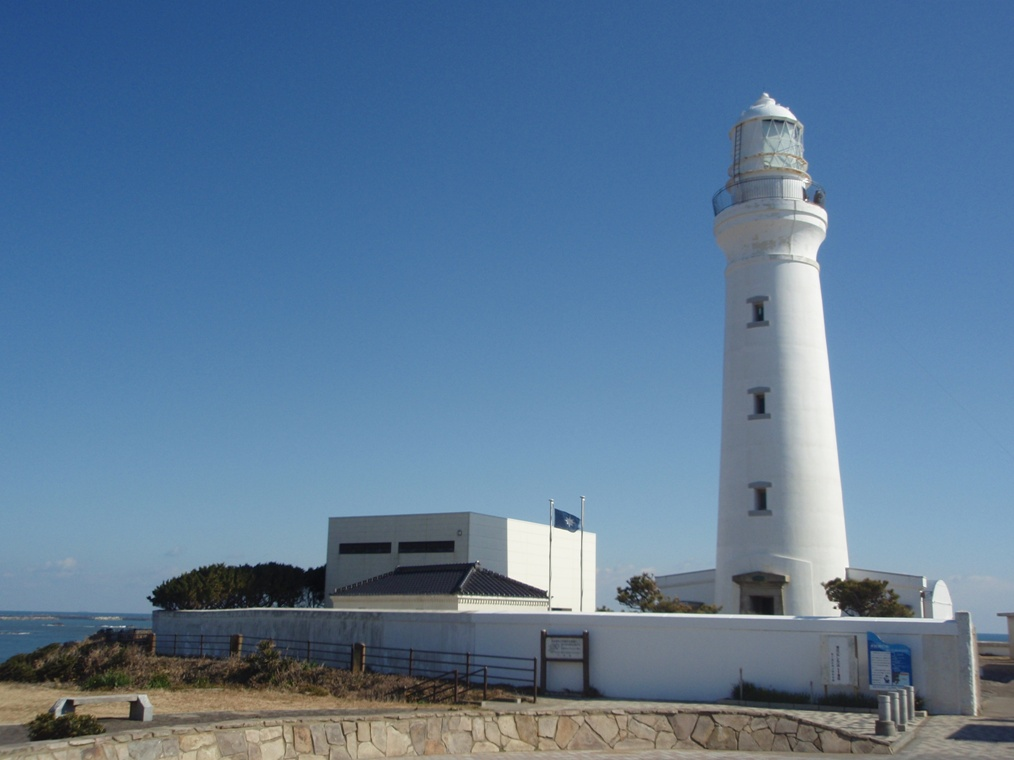
Inubōsaki Lighthouse in February 2008

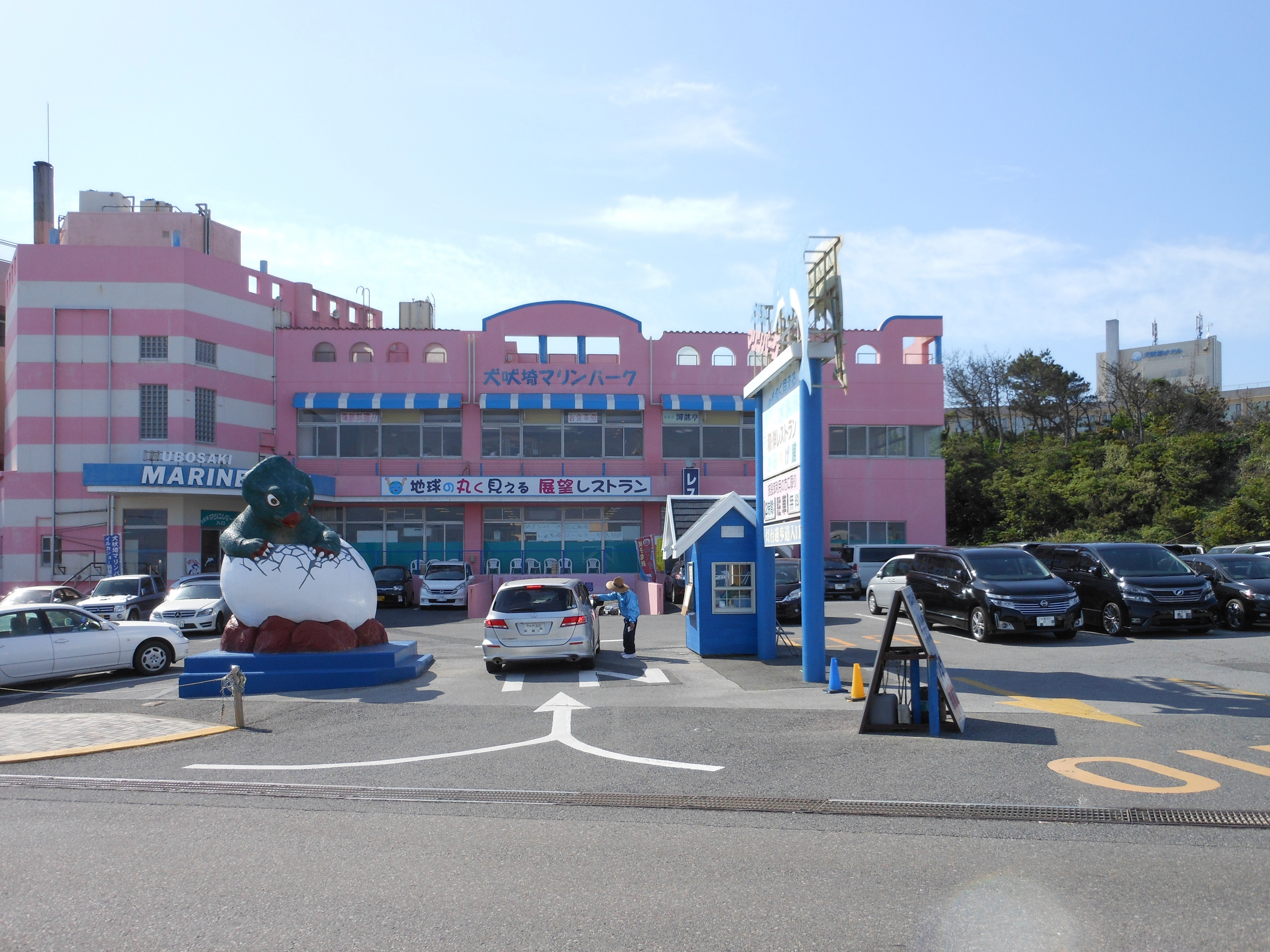
Inubosaki Marine Park in May 2015

- Inubōsaki Lighthouse
- Horizon Observatory (地球の丸く見える丘展望館, Chikyū-no-maruku-mieru Oka tenbōkan)
- Inubosaki Marine Park

=== Inubōsaki Onsen ===
Since 1996, a number of hotels in the vicinity started boring for onsen hot springs.

- Inubōsaki Keisei Hotel (犬吠埼京成ホテル)
- Grand Hotel Isoya (グランドホテル磯屋) (closed 20 April 2012)
- Inubōsaki Kankō Hotel (犬吠埼観光ホテル)
- Inubōsaki Royal Hotel (犬吠埼ロイヤルホテル)
- Hotel New Daishin (ホテルニュー大新)
- Gyōkeikan (ぎょうけい館)
- Ocean Spa Taiyou no Sato (オーシャンスパ犬吠埼太陽の里)

== See also ==
- List of railway stations in Japan
