= Chōshi Electric Railway Line =

Railway line in Chiba Prefecture, Japan

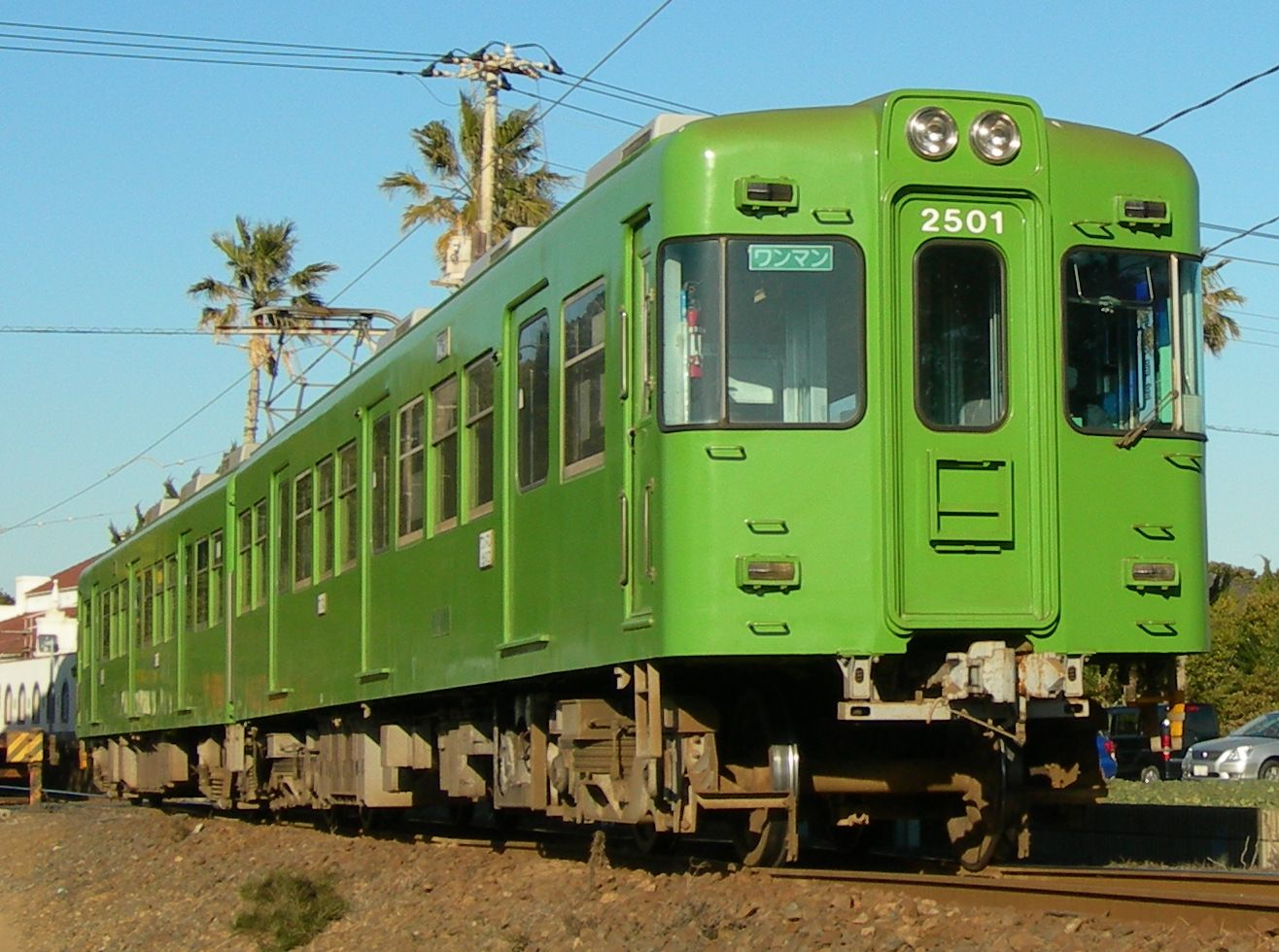
- Chōshi Electric Railway 2000 series set 2001 in January 2011

Overview
- Other name: Inubō Gakeppuchi Line
- Native name: 銚子電気鉄道線
- Status: Operational
- Owner: Chōshi Electric Railway
- Locale: Chiba Prefecture
- Termini: Chōshi; Tokawa
- Stations: 10

Service
- Type: Heavy rail
- Depot: Nakanochō
- Rolling stock: 2000 series 3000 series

History
- Opened: 5 July 1923; 103 years ago

Technical
- Line length: 6.4 km (4.0 mi)
- Num of tracks: 1
- Track gauge: 1,067 mm (3 ft 6 in)
- Electrification: Overhead line, 600 V DC
- Operating speed: 40 km/h (25 mph)
Route map

The Chōshi Electric Railway Line (Japanese: 銚子電気鉄道線, Hepburn: Chōshi Denki Tetsudō-sen) is a 6.4-kilometre-long (4.0 mi) private railway line running between Chōshi and Tokawa stations in Chiba Prefecture, Japan. It is operated by the Chōshi Electric Railway, also known as Chōden. (Note: A contraction of the company's Japanese name, Chōshi Denki.)

It is Chōshi Electric Railway's only line and is facing declining ridership. The company ventured into selling nure-senbei (moist senbei rice crackers) to subsidize its operations, and the profits from snack sales are now double those from its railway operations.

== Service pattern ==
All trains stop at all stations, with trains passing at Kasagami-Kurohae Station. Since 21 November 2013, one train per hour runs during the daytime.

Previously, two to three trains operated per hour throughout the day. In the past, two- or three-car formations were operated on New Year's Day to transport passengers to see the first sunrise of the year at the popular coastal viewing point in Inubōsaki, near Inuboh Station.

Outside and inside a Chōshi Electric Railway Line train, 2021

== Stations ==
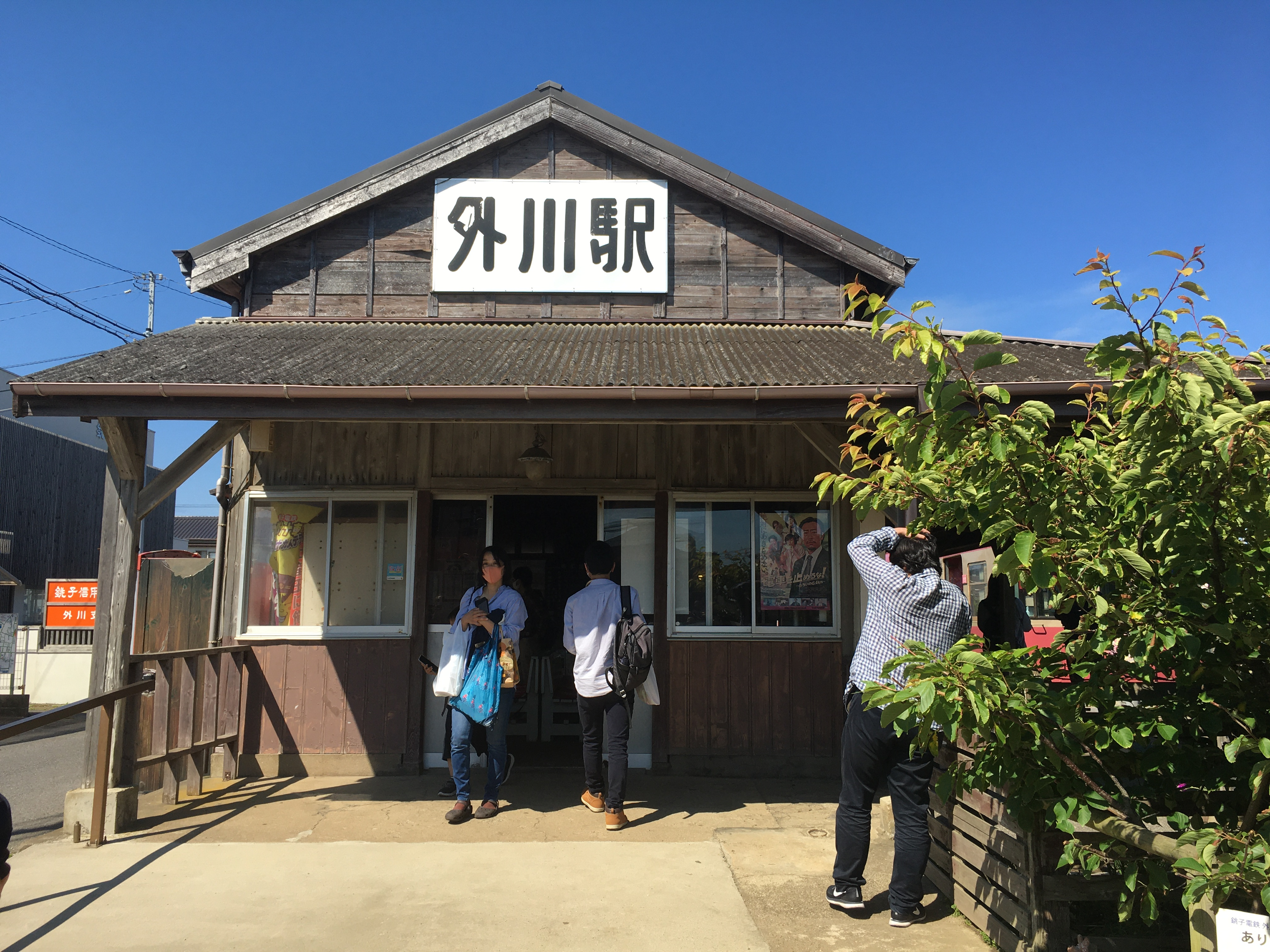
The southern terminus of the line, Tokawa Station, May 2021

All stations are in Chōshi.

No.	Station	Distance in km (mi)		Date opened	Status	Transfers
No.	Station	Between stations	Total	Date opened	Status	Transfers
CD-01	Chōshi 銚子	—N/a	0 (0)	5 July 1923	Staffed	■ Sōbu Main Line; ■ Narita Line
CD-02	Nakanochō 仲ノ町	0.5 (0.31)	0.5 (0.31)	5 July 1923	Staffed	
CD-03	Kannon 観音	0.6 (0.37)	1.1 (0.68)	5 July 1923	Staffed	
CD-04	Moto-Chōshi 本銚子	0.7 (0.43)	1.8 (1.1)	5 July 1923	Unstaffed	
CD-05	Kasagami-Kurohae 笠上黒生	0.9 (0.56)	2.7 (1.7)	1 July 1925	Staffed	
CD-06	Nishi-Ashikajima 西海鹿島	0.5 (0.31)	3.2 (2.0)	1 March 1970	Unstaffed	
CD-07	Ashikajima 海鹿島	0.4 (0.25)	3.6 (2.2)	5 July 1923	Unstaffed	
CD-08	Kimigahama 君ヶ浜	1.1 (0.68)	4.7 (2.9)	21 June 1931	Unstaffed	
CD-09	Inuboh 犬吠	0.8 (0.50)	5.5 (3.4)	1 September 1935	Staffed	
CD-10	Tokawa 外川	0.9 (0.56)	6.4 (4.0)	5 July 1923	Staffed	

== Rolling stock ==
- 2000 series 2-car EMUs (x2, since 24 July 2010), former Iyo Railway 800 series (originally Keio Corporation 2010 series built in 1962)
- 3000 series 2-car EMU (since 26 March 2016), former Iyo Railway 700 series (originally Keio 5000 series)
- DeKi 3 electric locomotive, built in 1922 by AEG in Germany, based at Nakanochō Depot
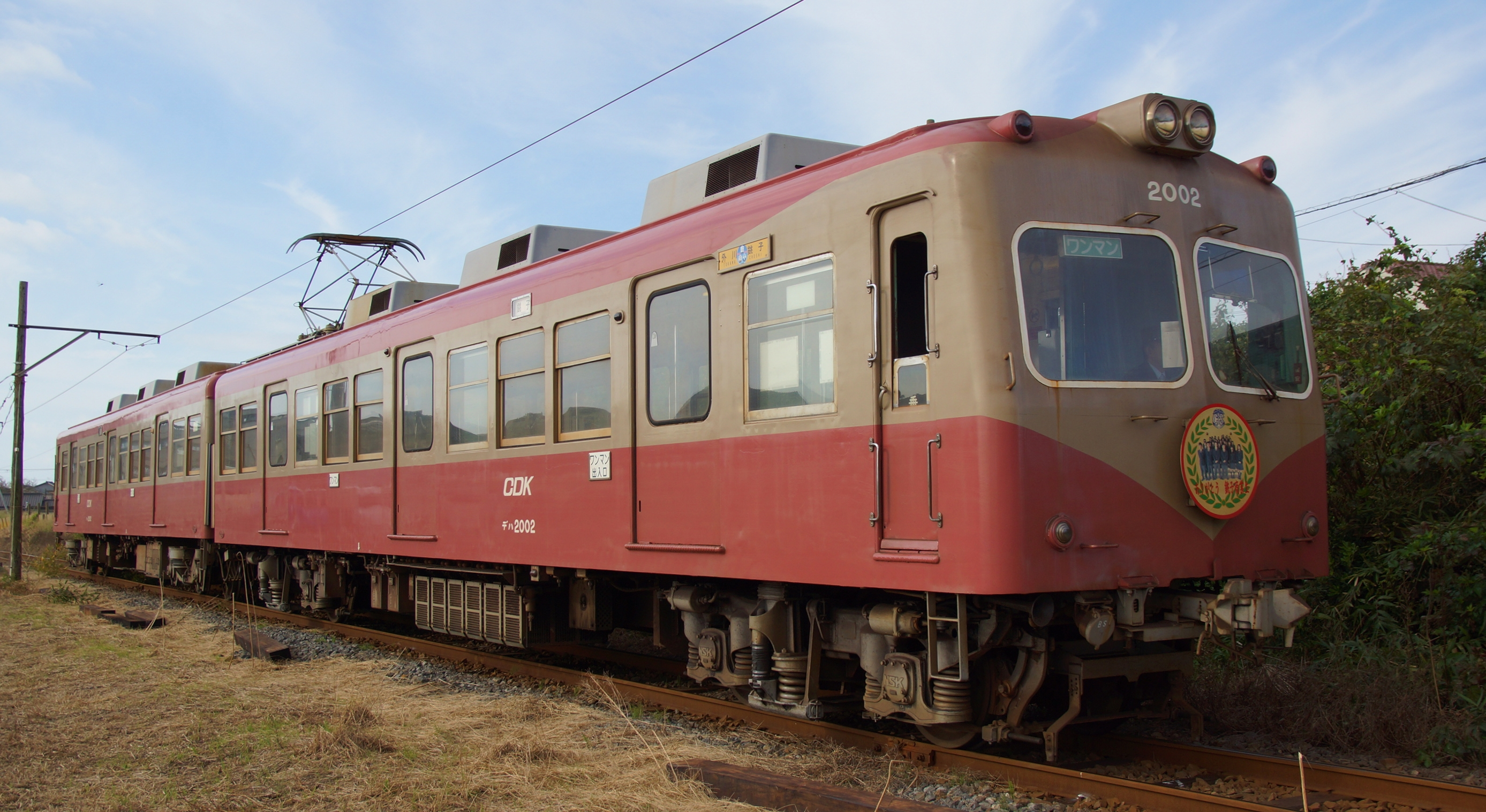
2000 series set 2002 in October 2015

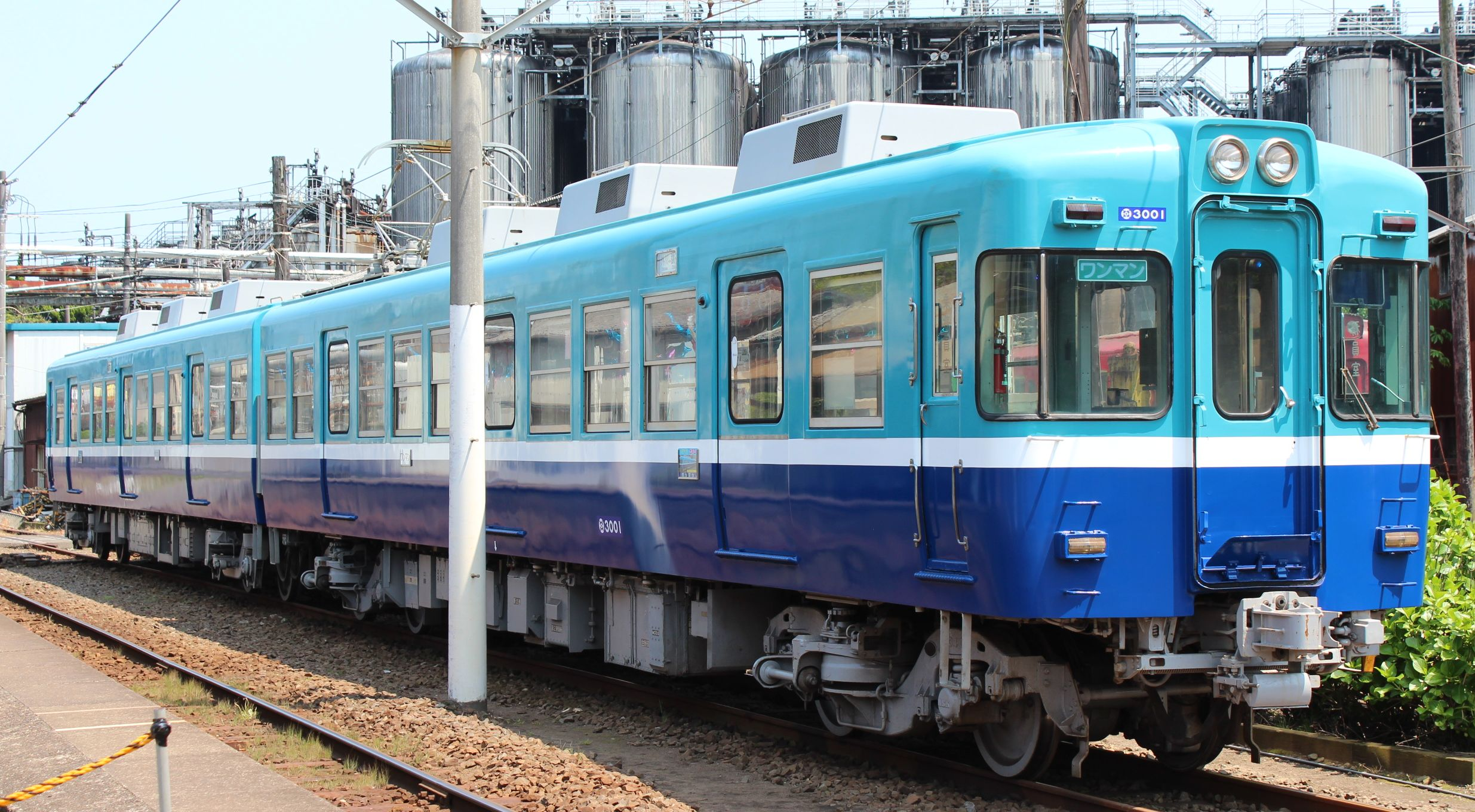
3000 series set 3001 in May 2016

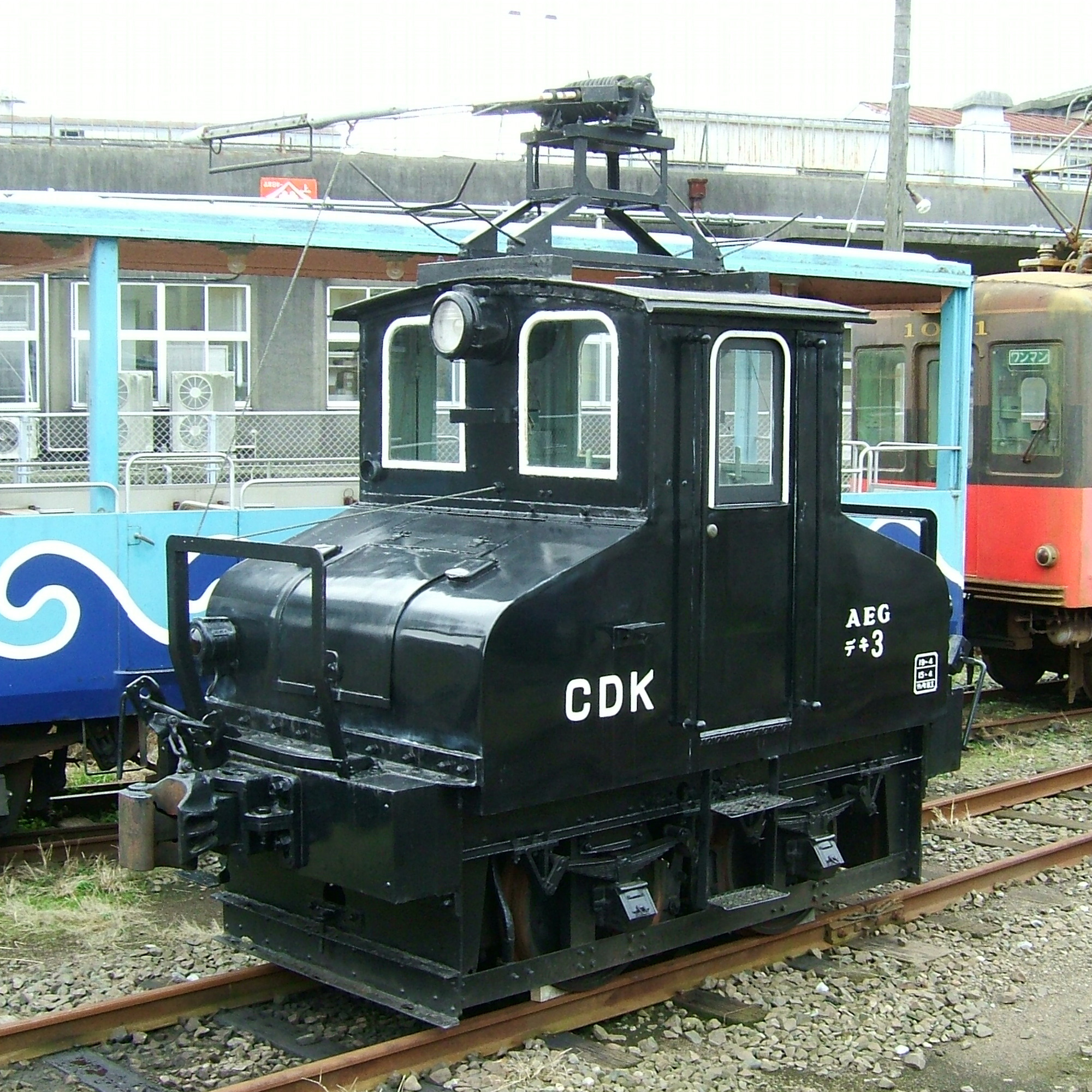
"DeKi 3" electric locomotive in December 2006

In 2007, it was announced that former Keio 3000 series stainless steel EMUs converted to 2-car sets would be purchased to replace the three vintage 700 and 800 series cars still in operation. This plan was however cancelled due to the cost of converting the 1,500 V DC cars to 600 V DC operation. Instead, two pairs of former Iyotetsu 800 series EMU cars were purchased in 2009, and these entered service in July 2010 following conversion work, becoming the 2000 series.

In September 2015, a two-car 700 series EMU was purchased from Iyotetsu for ¥1.3 million. The train entered service on the line in March 2016, following repainting into a two-tone blue livery.

=== Past rolling stock ===
- 0-6-0T steam locomotives 1 and 2 (former JNR 1102 and 1107) (Choshi Sightseeing Railway, December 1913 – November 1917)
- Ro 1, RoHa 1, Ha 1, HaNi 1 4-wheel coaches (Choshi Sightseeing Railway, December 1913 – November 1917)
- HaFu 1 and HaFu 2 non-powered trailer cars, withdrawn in September 1978 and cut up in 1979
- 100 series EMU car DeHa 101, built 1939, withdrawn in 1999, and scrapped in September 2009
- 200 series EMU car DeHa 201, (former Keisei MoNi 7, built in 1925), operated from 1949 until 1978, and officially withdrawn in 1979
- 300 series EMU car DeHa 301 (former Tsurumi Rinkō Railway MoHa 115, built in 1930), operated from 1951, withdrawn in 2008, scrapped in October 2009
- 500 series EMU car DeHa 501 (former Ueda Kōtsū MoHa 2321, built in 1939), operated from 1972, later sectioned at Inuboh Station, and cut up on-site in July 2012
- 700 series EMU car DeHa 701 (former Ohmi Railway MoHa 50 built in 1942), withdrawn in September 2010
- 700 series EMU car DeHa 702 (former Ohmi Railway MoHa 50, built 1942), withdrawn in January 2010
- 800 series EMU car DeHa 801 (former Iyo Railway MoHa 106 built in 1950), withdrawn in September 2010
- Yu 101 open car, (former WaMu 80000 freight car number WaMu 183983, built in 1969), operated from 4 August 1985, but taken out of service since 2004 due to safety regulations, and stored first at Tokawa Station and then at Kasagami-Kurohae Station before being official withdrawn on 30 June 2012
- 1000 series EMU car 1001 (former TRTA 2000 series built in 1960), withdrawn in February 2016
- 1000 series EMU car 1002 (former TRTA 2000 series built in 1959), withdrawn in February 2015
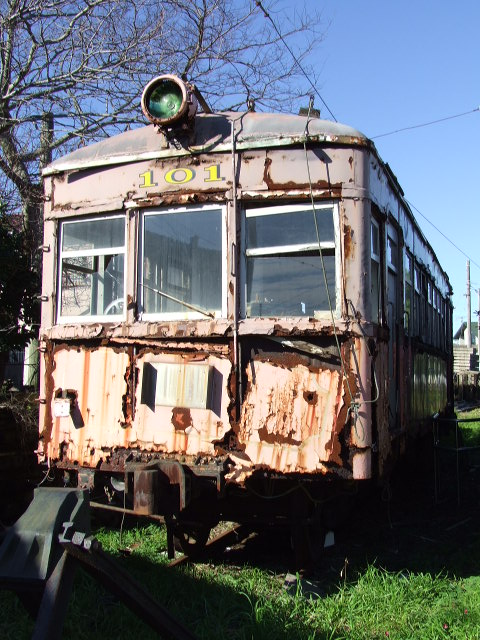
Withdrawn car DeHa 101 in December 2006

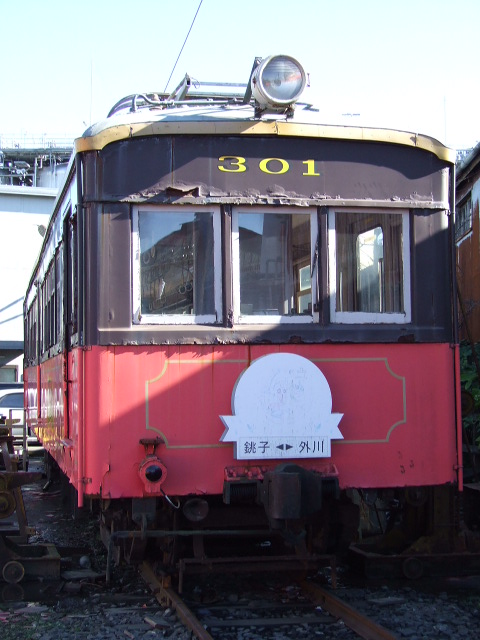
DeHa 301 in December 2006

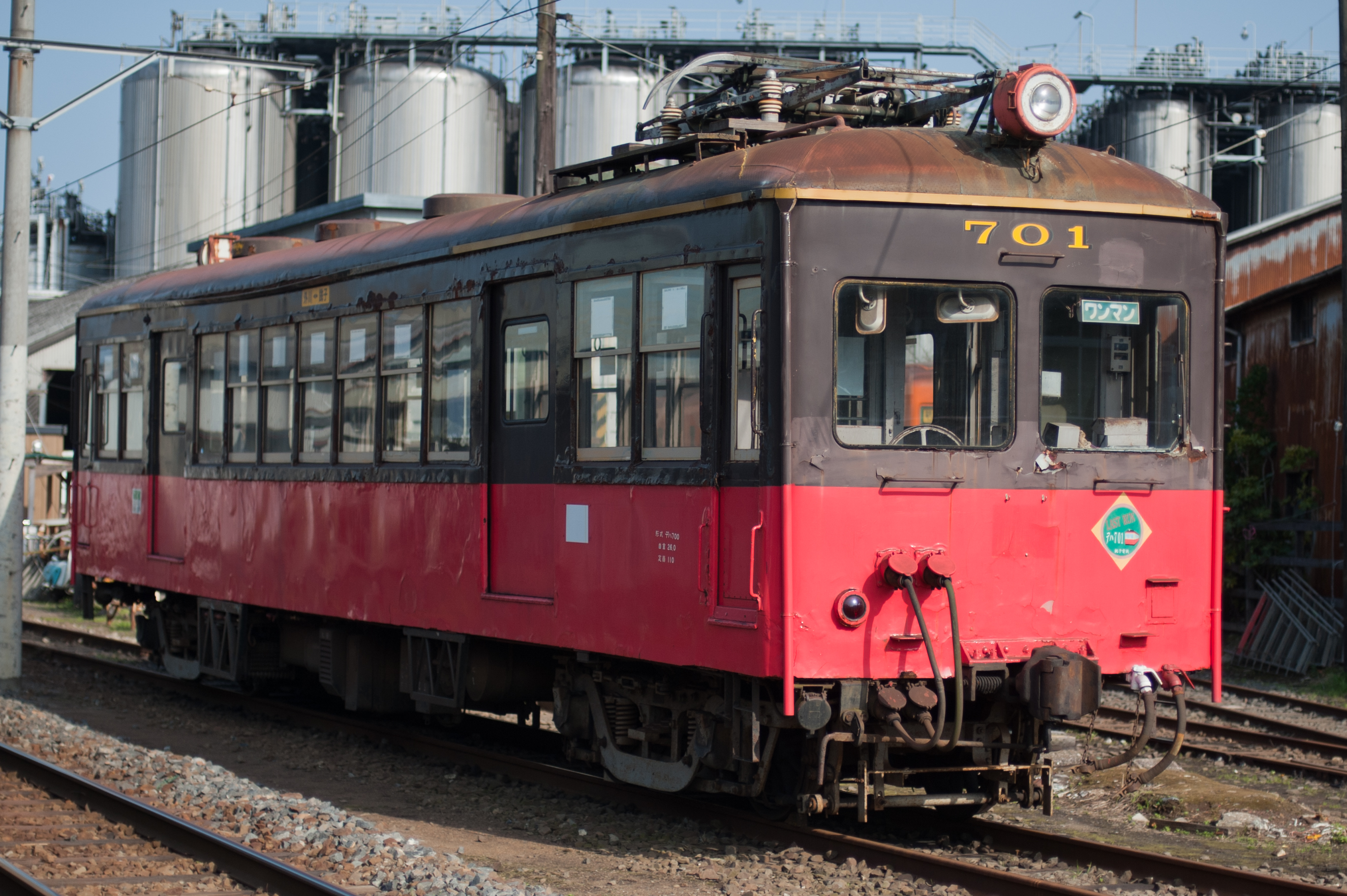
700 series car DeHa 701 in March 2010

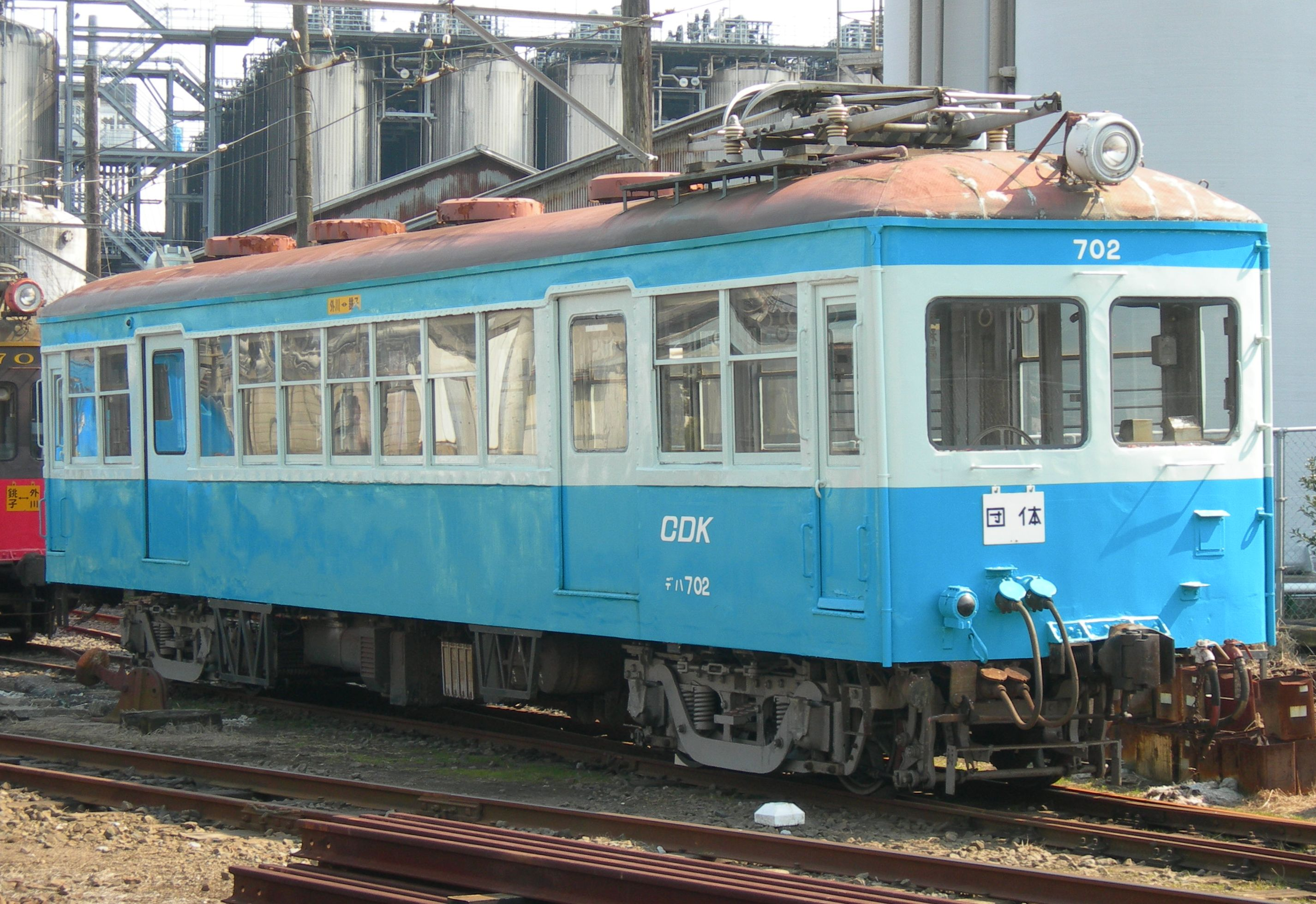
DeHa 702 in March 2008

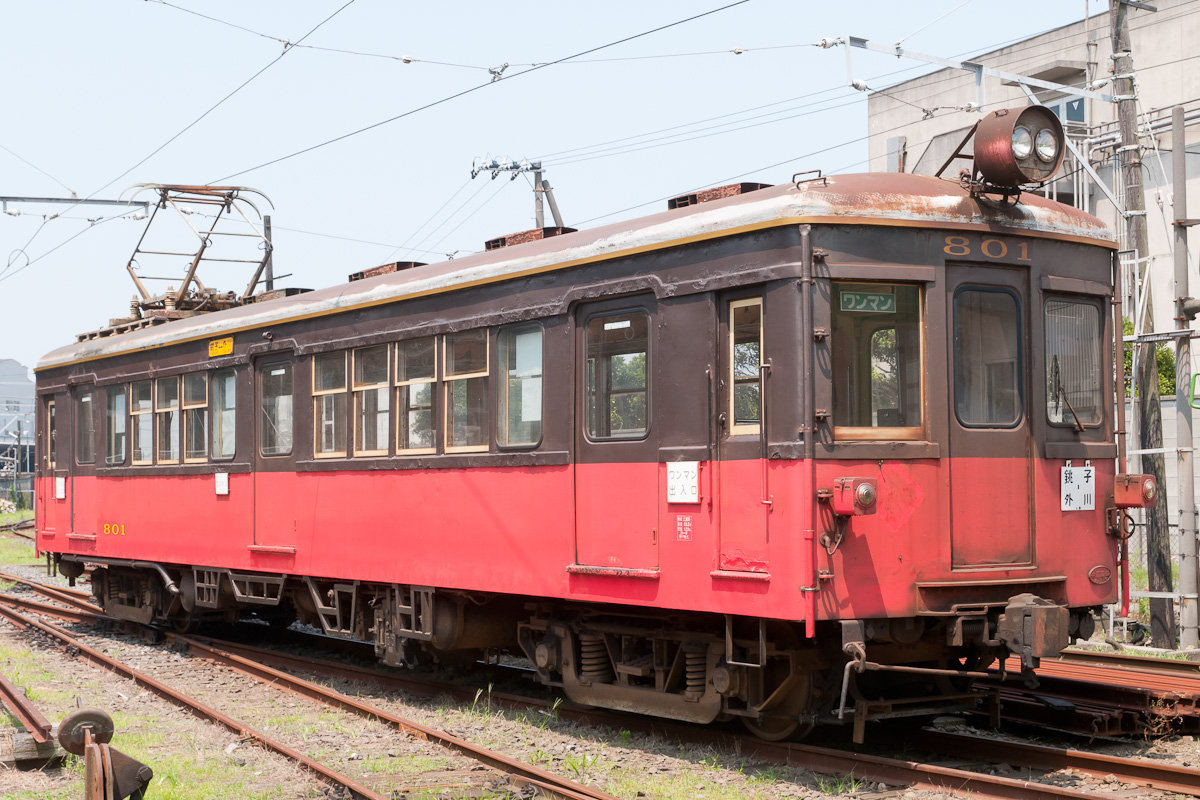
800 series car DeHa 801 in July 2010

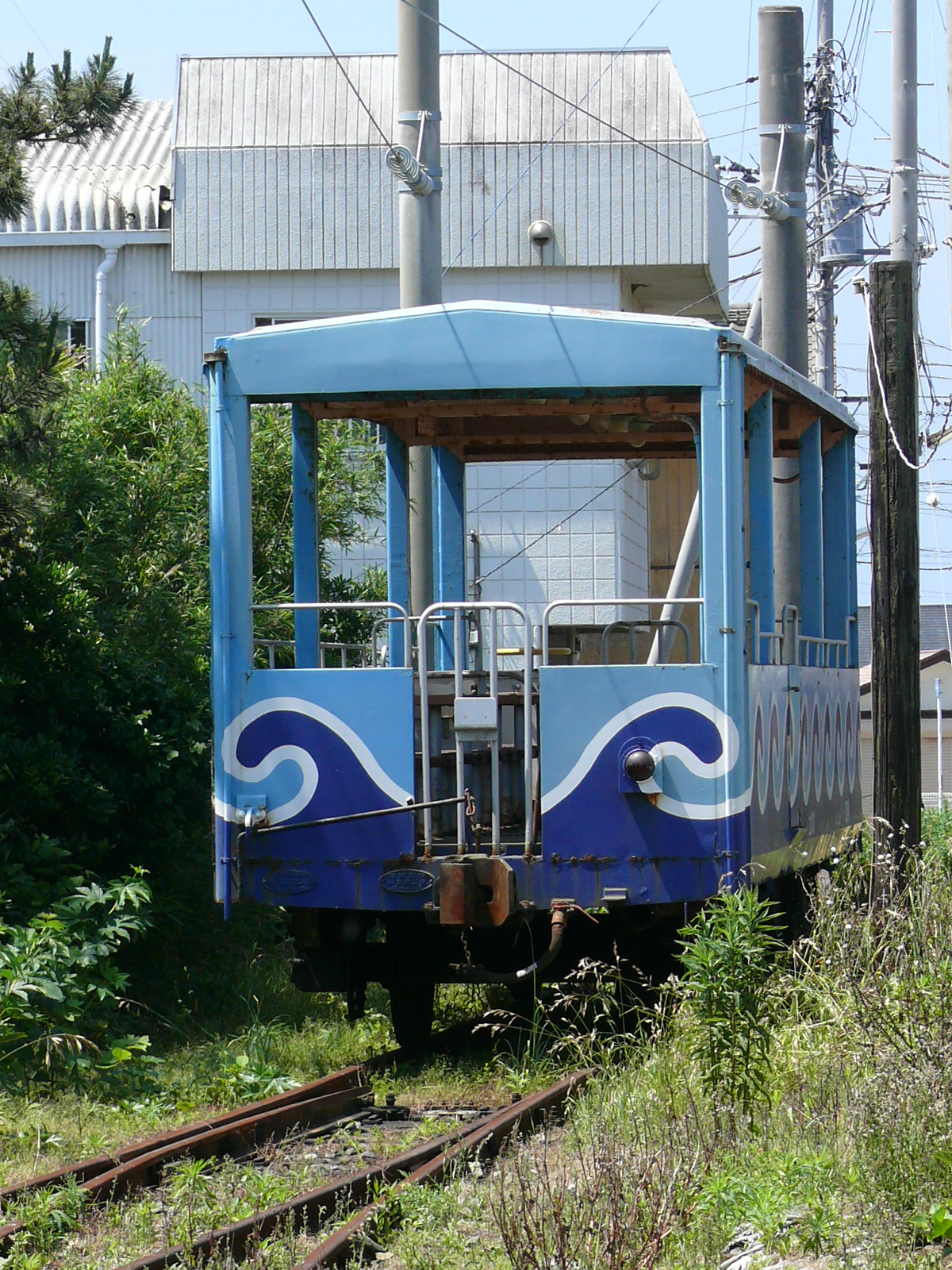
Yu 101 stored at Tokawa Station in January 2007

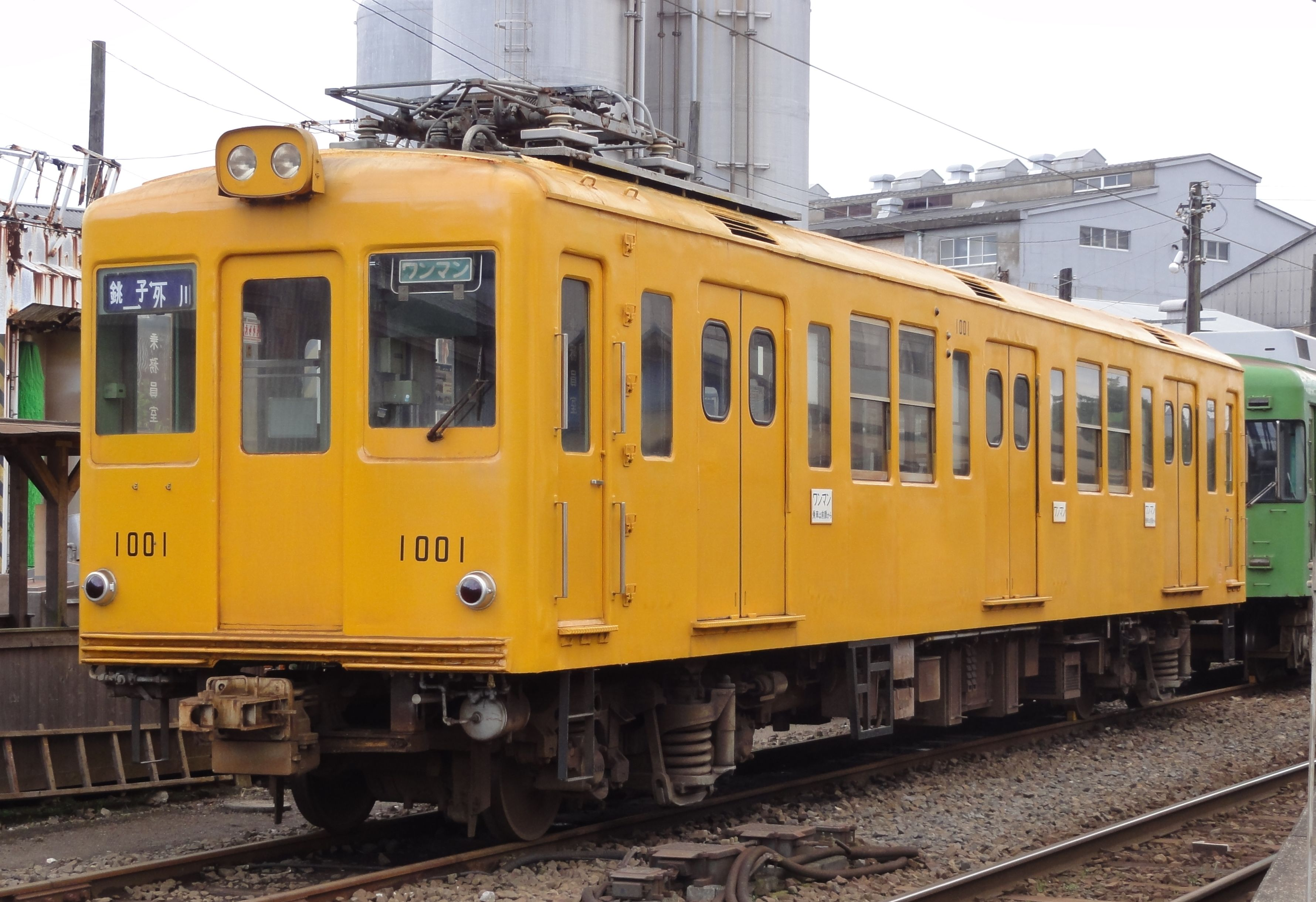
1000 series car DeHa 1001 in December 2012

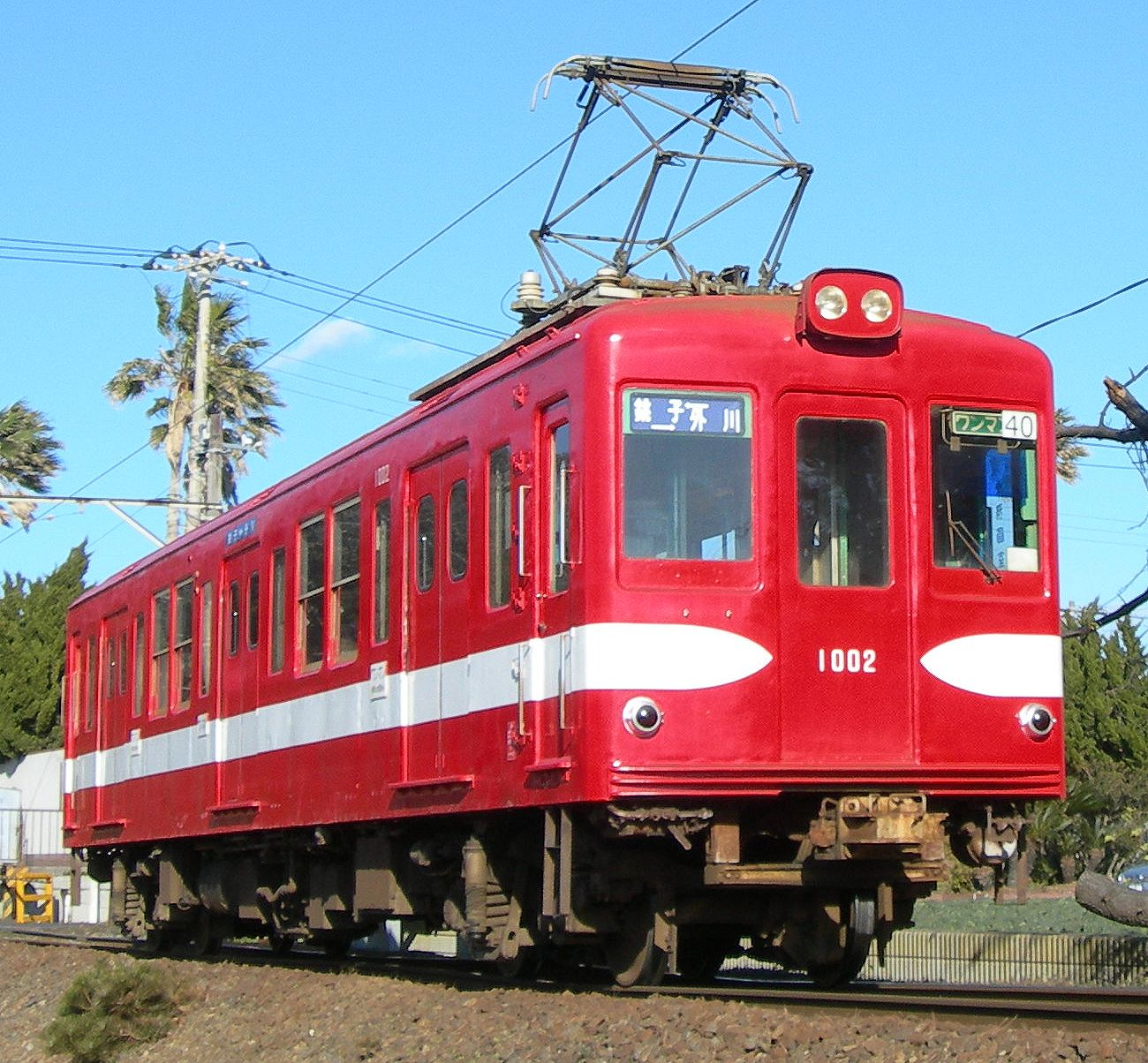
1000 series car DeHa 1002 in January 2012

== History ==
=== Chōshi Sightseeing Railway (1913-1917) ===
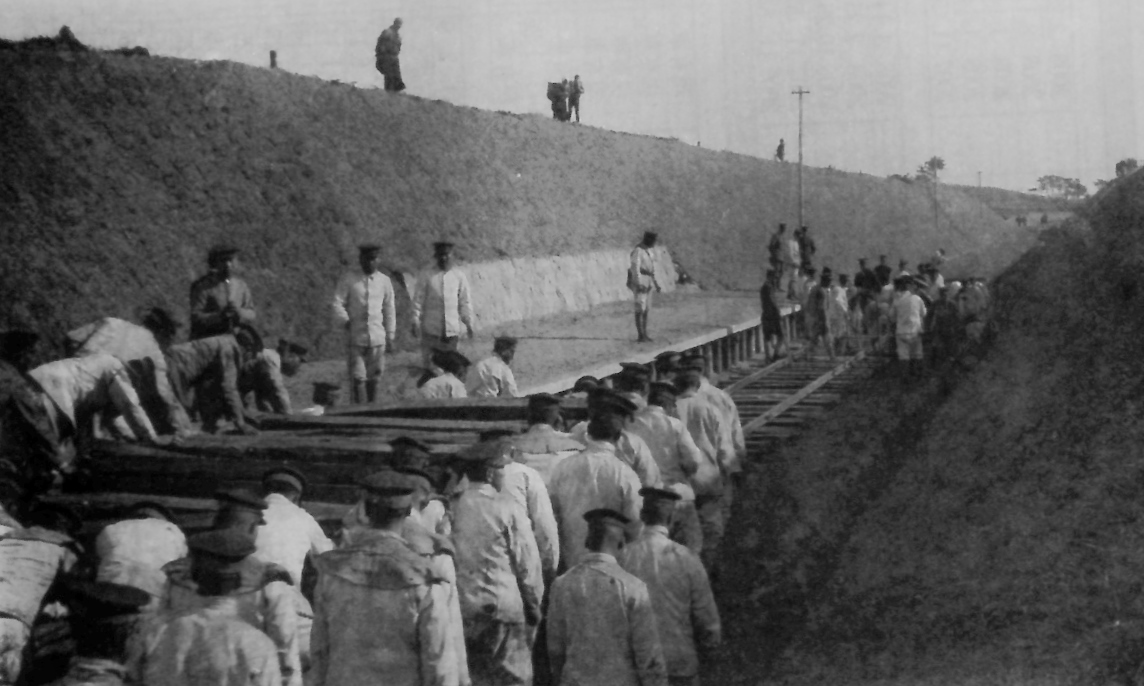
Moto-Choshi Station under construction by army engineers circa 1913

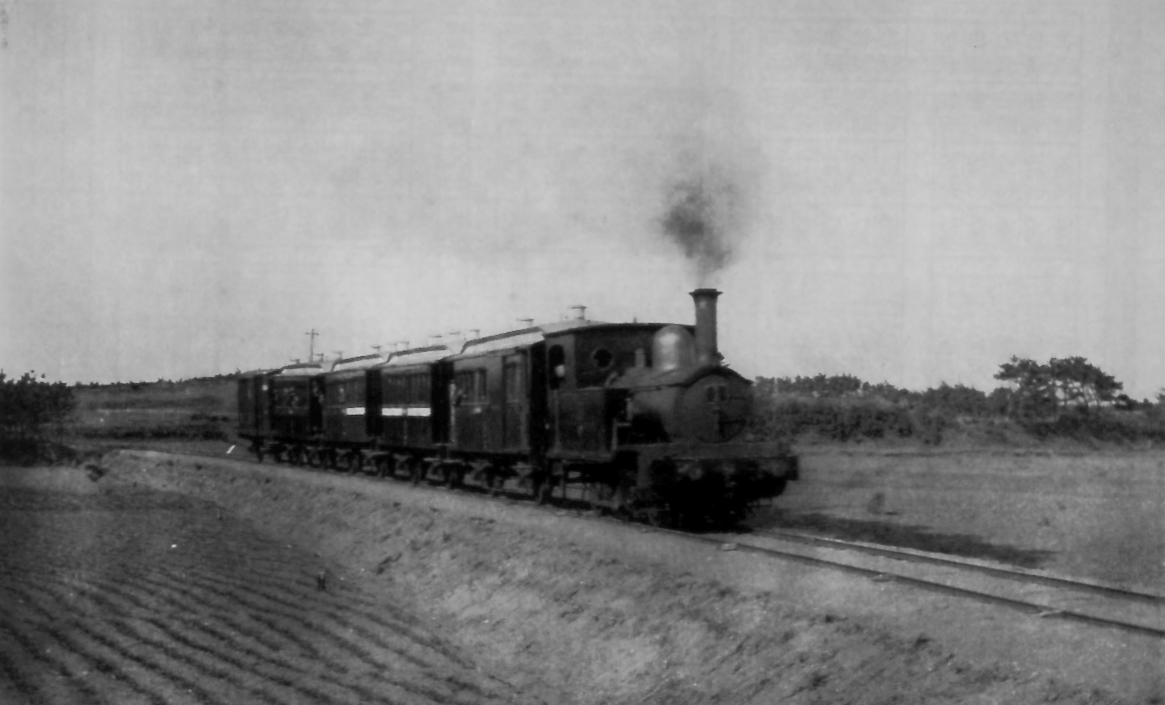
A Chōshi Sightseeing Railway train between Moto-Choshi and Ashikajima stations hauled by locomotive No. 1

The predecessor to the present-day line opened on 28 December 1913 as the Chōshi Sightseeing Railway (銚子遊覧鉄道, Chōshi Yūran Tetsudō), operating a distance of 5.9 km between Chōshi and Inuboh using steam haulage. The 1,067 mm (3 ft 6 in) gauge line was laid by a team of 235 army engineers in just 11 days. There were four intermediate stations, at Nakanocho, Kannon, Moto-Choshi, and Ashikajima, and by 1914, eight return services operated daily, with journeys taking 23 minutes. The line used two former JNR 0-6-0T steam locomotives built by Nasmyth, Wilson in the UK. These were numbered 1 and 2 (former JNR numbers 1102 and 1107 respectively).

Faced with poor ridership figures and increases in material costs caused by the outset of the First World War, the operating company announced its intention to close the line and sell off the infrastructure. This was met with violent protests from local residents, which resulted in the arrest of three people, recorded as the first public protest against railway closure plans in Japan. Despite the protests, the railway company terminated services on the line from the afternoon of 20 November 1917, and formally closed the line as of 30 November. The line's trackbed was converted to a dedicated bus route, but the station buildings remained intact. The two steam locomotives, 1 and 2, were sold to Yawata Steel Works, where they were renumbered 200 and 201, and operated until after the Second World War. The line's four passenger coaches were sold to the Rikuu Railway (now part of the JR Gono Line) in Aomori Prefecture, ultimately becoming numbers Ro 790, Ha 2555, Ha 2556, and HaNi 3680 in JNR days.

=== Chōshi Railway (1922-1948) ===
On 10 October 1922, the Chōshi Railway Company (銚子鉄道株式会社, Chōshi Tetsudō Kabushikigaisha) was formed, and the line was reopened from 5 July 1923 using the former Chōshi Sightseeing Railway trackbed and structures between Chōshi and Inuboh Stations, with an extension south to Tokawa. Rolling stock consisted of two petrol-engined locomotives and two two-axle carriages. The locomotives proved unreliable, however, and the line was electrified at 600 V DC from 1 July 1925, with a fleet of three electric cars purchased from the former Ina Electric Railway (伊那電気鉄道, Ina Denki Tetsudō) (present-day JR Iida Line).

Services on the line were suspended from 20 July 1945, following air raid damage. A C class steam tank locomotive was borrowed from JNR to resume operations on the line from December 1945, and electric train operations resumed from 4 April 1946.

=== Chōshi Electric Railway (1948-) ===
On 20 August 1948, the operating company was renamed Chōshi Electric Railway (銚子電気鉄道, Chōshi Denki Tetsudō).

In 1956, a private track was laid directly from Chōshi Station to the nearby Yamasa soy sauce factory, which virtually eliminated freight operations handled by the Chōshi Electric Railway. And, this company was invested by Chiba Kotsu which has been an affiliated company of Keisei Electric Railway on 1 November 1960 and had been a subsidiary of Keisei Group since then until 1990. In 1963, a decision was made to close the line, but this decision was overturned following opposition from the local communities and funding from Chōshi City. To the present day, the line is largely subsidized by Chiba Prefecture and Chōshi City.

Freight operations on the line were discontinued from 1 February 1984. On 21 December 1989, Chiba Kotsu transferred a 52% share of this company which was owned by Chiba Kotsu to Choden Kosan which was managed by Uchino Komuten. That's because this railway line was competitive with a lot of bus routes which were operated by Chiba Kotsu of the parent company, which caused that a bus company and railway company both were in red. After that this company got to a subsidiary of Choden Kosan in January 1990 by transferring right to management. From 1 April 1995, operations on the line switched to driver-only operation because this company would extremely decrease expenditures. But, the pure loss of the management had increased because Uchinoya Komuten of a parent company had nine hundred ninety billion yen as debt and took an application of bankruptcy.

From 21 November 2013, services were cut back from two trains per hour to one train per hour during the daytime.

In 2019, the company announced the production of a movie called Don't Stop the Train!: The Cursed 6.4 km (電車を止めるな！～のろいの6.4km～, Densha o Tomeru na! ~Noroi no 6.4 km~). The 84 minute long horror comedy is set on the Chōshi Electric Railway line and was first shown in cinemas in 2020.

As a response to the COVID-19 pandemic starting in early 2020 and the associated dramatic decline in passenger numbers, the company has started to produce and publish short videos about the railway on YouTube. The channel is called Chōshi Electric Railway Fierce Channel (【銚子電鉄】激つらチャンネル, (Chōshi Dentetsu) Gekitsura Channeru) and contains videos about various places on and around the railway, such as the railway shed, the main office and various stations along the line. The videos often feature different staff members, mainly Katsuki Takemoto (CEO), Riho Sodeyama (conductor) and more recently also Kazuki Fukushima, a young station attendant.

As part of its "Gakeppuchi Project" tourism campaign, the Chōshi Electric Railway branded the line as the Inubō Gakeppuchi Line (犬吠崖っぷちライン, Inubō Gakeppuchi Rain; lit. 'Inubō cliff-edge line') from 1 April 2025. The branding is planned to be used until the end of March 2026.

== Accidents ==
A head-on collision occurred in June 1995 north of Kasagami-Kurohae Station between DeHa 701 on a down (Tokawa-bound) service and DeHa 1001 on an up (Chōshi-bound) service. Both cars sustained front-end damage. DeHa 701 was returned to service in April 1996 following repairs and repainting back into the standard livery of dark brown and red.

On 11 January 2014, at 08:19, 2000 series 2-car EMU set 2002 from Tokawa to Choshi derailed on a track switch on the approach to Kasagami-Kurohae Station. Two of the train's bogies were derailed, but the train remained upright and none of the nine passengers on board were injured.

== Passenger statistics ==
The annual passenger statistics for past years are as shown below.

Fiscal year	Passengers per year
1955	1,740,000
1960	1,604,000
1965	1,609,000
1970	1,364,000
1975	1,550,000
1980	1,454,000
1985	1,336,000
1990	1,031,000
1995	932,000
2000	739,000
2005	654,000
2009	714,000

== In popular culture ==
Tokawa Station on the line was used as a filming location for the 1985 NHK TV drama series Miotsukushi (澪つくし).

The line formed the backdrop for the 2015 novel Tomoshibi: Choshi Dentetsu no Chiisa na Kiseki (トモシビ-銚子電鉄の小さな奇蹟) written by Midori Yoshino. The book was made into a film, titled Tomoshibi (トモシビ-銚子電鉄の小さな奇蹟), released in Japan in 2017.

The line is seen in Season 2, Episode 5 of the Anime called The Devil is a Part-Timer! where the six main characters ride the line to Inuboh station.

== See also ==
- Chiba Kotsu (former parent company)
