= Tokawa Station =

Railway station in Chōshi, Chiba Prefecture, Japan

Tokawa Station 外川駅
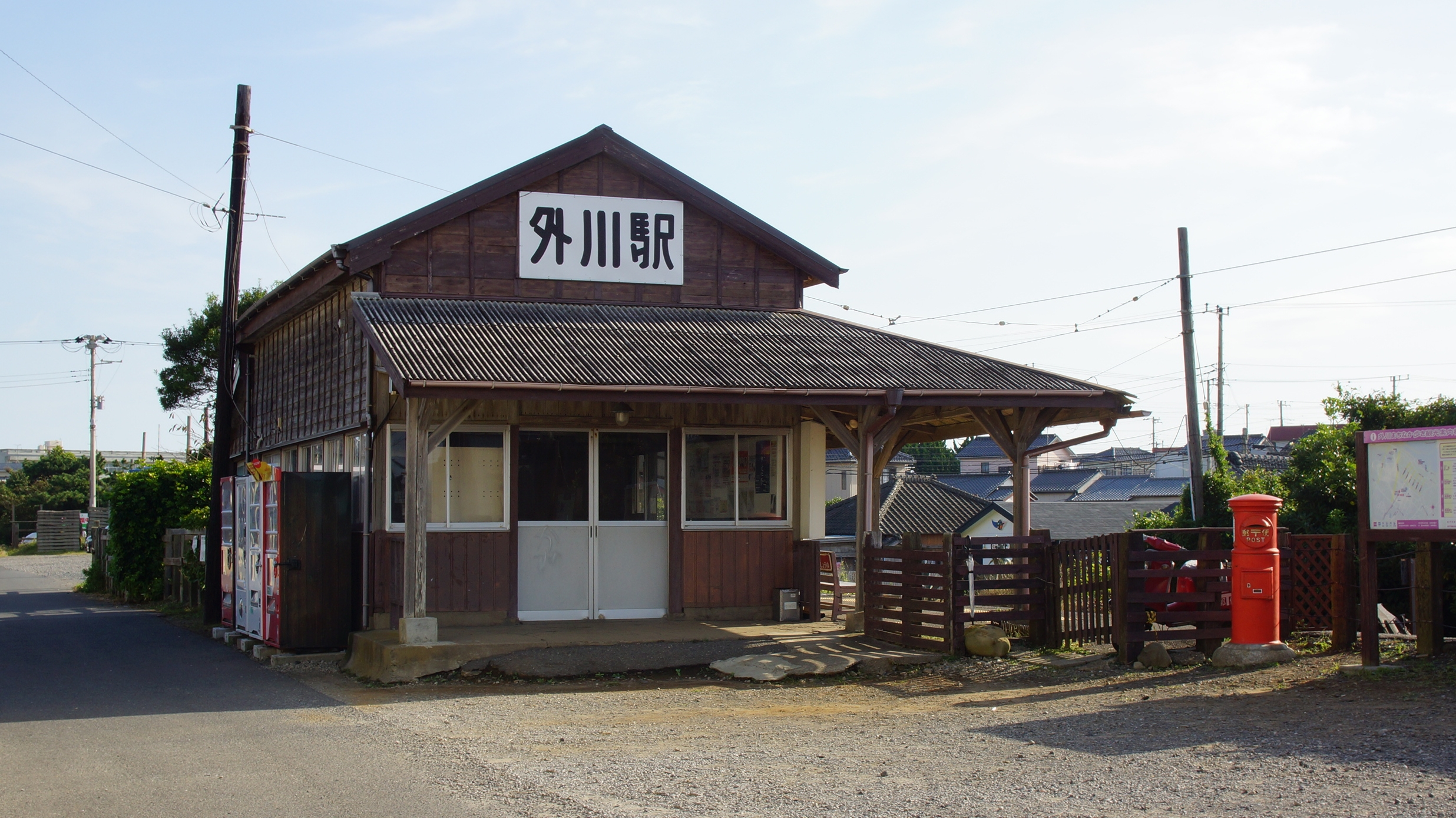
- The station exterior and forecourt in October 2015

General information
- Location: 2-10636 Tokawa-machi, Chōshi-shi, Chiba-ken 288-0014; Japan
- Coordinates: 35°41′57″N 140°51′25″E
- Operator: Choshi Electric Railway
- Line: Choshi Electric Railway Line
- Distance: 6.4 km from Chōshi
- Platforms: 1 (1 side platform)
- Tracks: 1

Construction
- Parking: Yes

Other information
- Station code: CD10

History
- Opened: 5 July 1923

Passengers
- FY2010: 209 daily

Services
Preceding station	Choshi Electric Railway	Following station
Inuboh towards Chōshi	Chōshi Electric Railway Line	Terminus
Location
- Location within Chiba Prefecture Location within Japan

Tokawa Station (外川駅, Tokawa-eki) is a railway station on the privately operated Chōshi Electric Railway Line in Chōshi, Chiba, Japan.

== Lines ==
Tokawa Station forms the southern terminus of the Chōshi Electric Railway Line from Chōshi and is a distance of 6.4 km (4.0 mi) from Chōshi Station.

== Station layout ==
As of 2013, the station is staffed, and consists of a side platform serving a single track, with a run-around loop used as a storage siding.

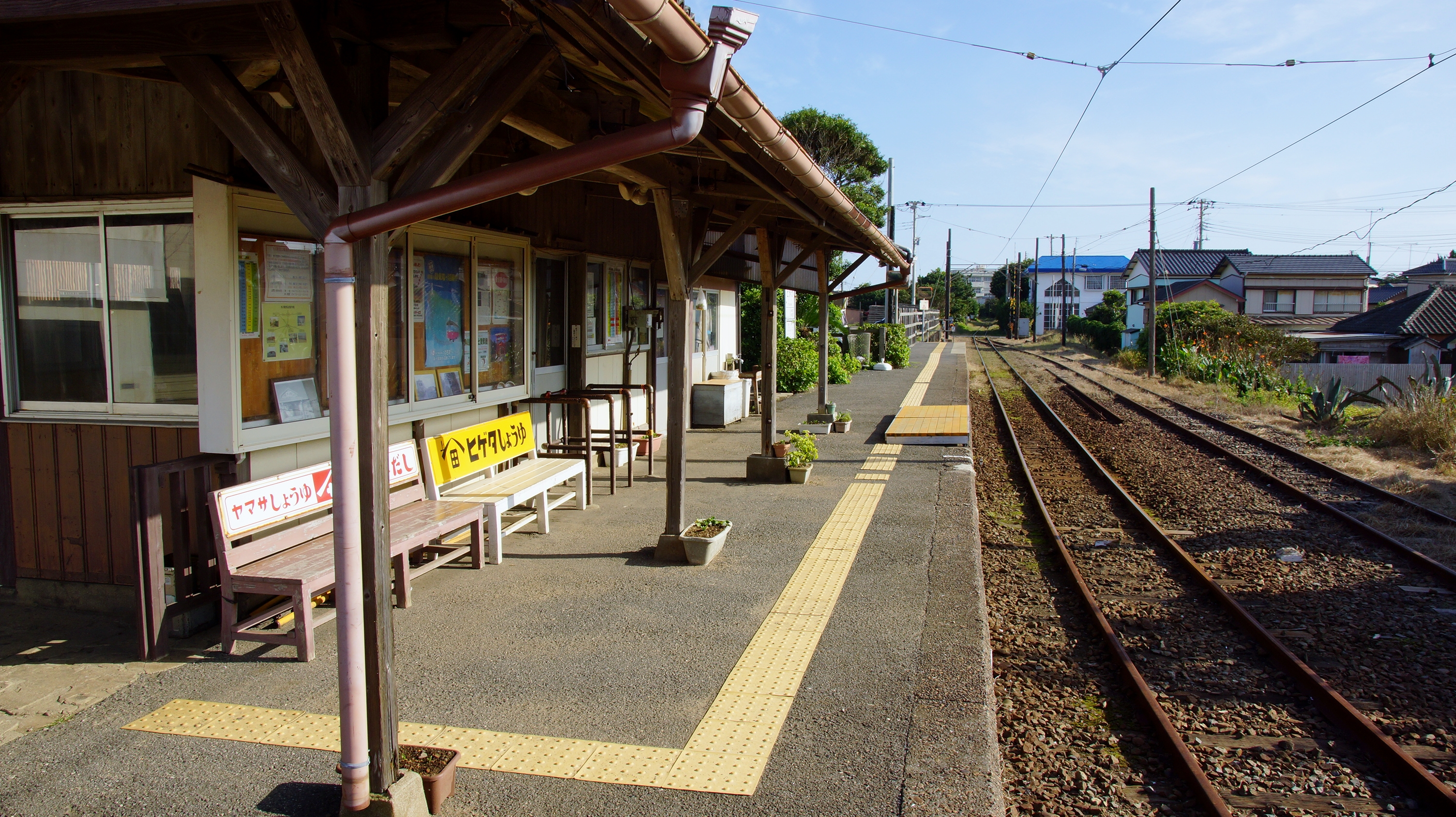
The platform in October 2015

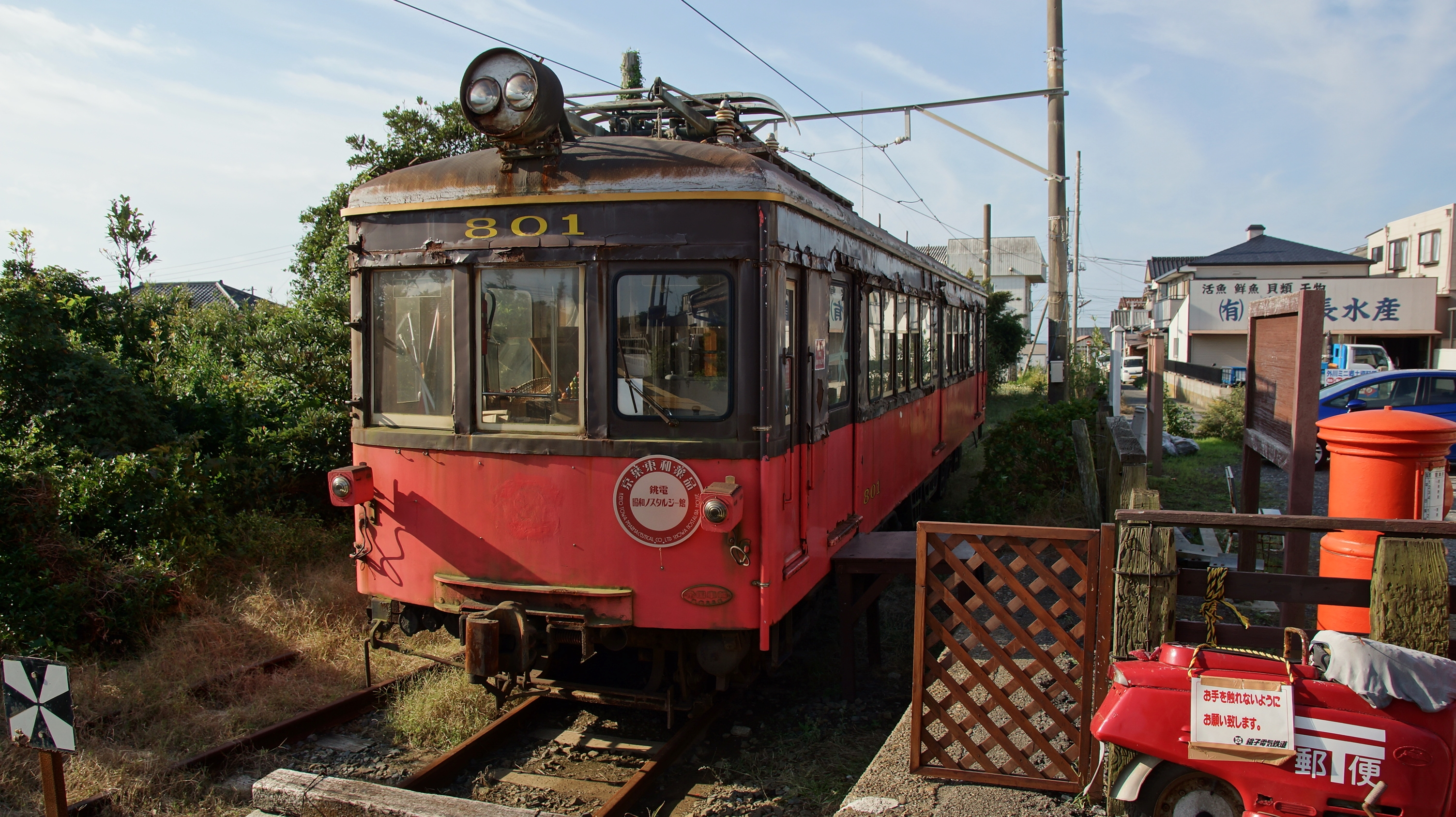
Withdrawn DeHa 801 housing the Keiyo Towa Pharmaceutical Showa Nostalgia Museum in October 2015

== History ==
Tokawa Station opened on 5 July 1923.

== Passenger statistics ==
In fiscal 2010, the station was used by an average of 209 passengers daily (boarding passengers only). The passenger figures for previous years are as shown below.

Fiscal year	Daily average
2007	150
2008	242
2009	232
2010	209

== Surrounding area ==
- Tokawa Mini Furusato Museum
- Tokawa Harbour
- Chōshi Marina
- Nagasaki Beach
- Chiba Institute of Science

=== Eight fishing lanes ===
Close to Tokawa Station, there are eight historical lanes leading down the hill to the sea and fishing harbour. These are named as follows, from east to west.

- Ōmichi (王路)
- Amba-dōri (阿波通り)
- Nagaya-dōri (長屋通り)
- Shinura-dōri (新浦通り)
- Ichijō-dōri (一条通り)
- Isshin-dōri (一心通り)
- Motoura-dōri (本浦通り)
- Jōbō-dōri (条坊通り)

== Film location ==
The station building has been used as a filming location, including the 1985 NHK TV drama series Miotsukushi (澪つくし).

== See also ==
- List of railway stations in Japan
