= 3000 series =

3000 series may refer to:

== Japanese train types ==
- Chichibu Railway 3000 series EMU
- Chikuho Electric Railroad 3000 series electric multiple unit operated on the Chikuhō Electric Railroad Line
- Choshi Electric Railway 3000 series EMU
- Fukuoka Subway 3000 series EMU
- Hakone Tozan 3000 series EMU
- Hankyu 3000 series EMU, operated by Hankyu Railway
- Izukyu 3000 series EMU
- Keihan 3000 series (1971) EMU
- Keihan 3000 series EMU
- Keio 3000 series EMU
- Keisei 3000 series EMU
- Kintetsu 3000 series EMU
- Nagoya Municipal Subway 3000 series EMU
- Nishitetsu 3000 series EMU
- Odakyu 3000 series EMU
- Odakyu 3000 series SE EMU
- Osaka Monorail 3000 series EMU
- Sanyo 3000 series EMU
- Seibu 3000 series EMU
- Semboku 3000 series EMU
- Sendai Subway 3000 series EMU
- Shizuoka Railway A3000 series EMU
- Tobu 3000 series EMU
- Tokyu 3000 series EMU
- TRTA 3000 series EMU
- TX-3000 series EMU
- Yokohama Municipal Subway 3000 series EMU

== South Korean train types ==
- Seoul Metro 3000 series

== Taiwanese train types ==
- EMU3000 series

== See also ==
- 3000 (disambiguation)
