= 3000 =

3000 or 3000s usually refers to:

- 3000 (number), the decimal number
- 3000 AD/CE, the last year of the 30th century
- 3000 BC(E), a year in the 3rd millennium BC
- 3000s AD/CE, a decade, century, millennium in the 4th millennium
- 3000s BC(E), a decade, century, millennium in the 4th millennium BC

3000 or 3,000 may also refer to:

== Arts and entertainment ==
- André 3000, American singer and actor
- 3000, also styled Three Thousand, the title of the screenplay by J.F. Lawton that was adapted as Pretty Woman (1990)
- "Year 3000", a song performed by British pop punk band Busted

== Sport ==
- 3000 (dinghy), a racing sailing dinghy
- 3000 metres, a track running event
- 3,000 hit club, Major League Baseball batters with 3,000 hits

== Science and technology ==
- Fiat 3000, an Italian tank
- HP 3000, a minicomputer
- Lenovo 3000, a computer
- 3000 Leonardo, an asteroid in the Asteroid Belt, the 3000th asteroid registered

== Other uses ==
- 3000 (District of Elbasan), one of the postal codes in Albania
- Whelen Engineering Company WPS-3000, a 16 speaker siren made from 1981 to 1991

== See also ==
- 3000 series (disambiguation)
