= Laser 3000 =

Racing dinghy

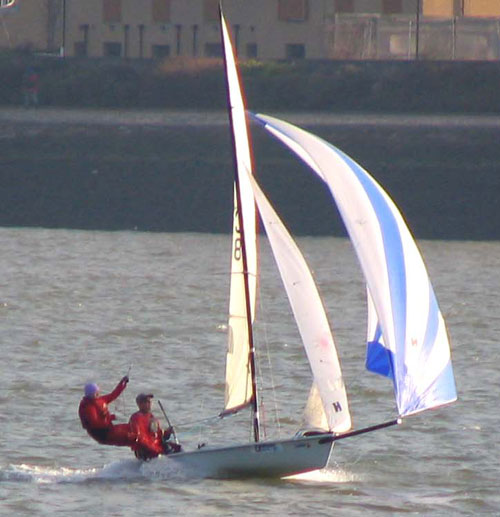

Boat
- Crew: 2

Hull
- Hull weight: 79 kilograms (174 lb)
- LOA: 4.40 metres (14.4 ft)
- Beam: 1.46 metres (4.8 ft)

Rig
- Mast height: 6.02 metres (19.8 ft) (overall)

Sails
- Mainsail area: 8.60 square metres (92.6 sq ft)
- Jib/genoa area: 2.94 square metres (31.6 sq ft)
- Spinnaker area: 12.80 square metres (137.8 sq ft)

Racing
- D-PN: 83.3
- RYA PN: 1085

The Laser 3000 is a racing sailing dinghy crewed by two persons with a trapeze for the crew. Launched in 1996, the 3000 was developed from the Laser 2, using the original Frank Bethwaite-designed planing hull combined with a brand new self-draining deck by Derek Clark. Clark also re-designed the rig, using spars and sails from premium proprietary sources and replacing the symmetric spinnaker of the Laser 2 by a larger asymmetrical spinnaker. The gennaker is chute-launched and retrieved using a single halyard line, and is set on a retractable bowsprit. Helm balance and handling were improved using a shorter-footed mainsail with two full-width battens giving a larger roach. A mast with conventional spreaders replaced the now-unusual diamond arrangement of the Laser 2.

Originally built by Laser, boats tagged 'V3000' currently built to the design by VanderCraft are constructed from woven glass and epoxy resin using vacuum-bagging to produce a boat which is very stiff and light yet durable. These boats race together with Laser 3000's in races within the 3000 Class.

Again, while the original Hyde sails are still competitive, North Sails now offer a cheaper alternative using the latest cloth technology. The centre-sheeting optionally via a deck-mounted jammer or directly ‘off-the-boom’ may include a centre or an aft bridle, and a compression-strut kicker (‘GNAV’) is allowed which gives the crew much more space than the conventional kicking strap.

The boat is easy to sail singlehanded, optionally using the jib, gennaker and/or trapeze, the latter being easy to use thanks to the deck layout and lack of racks. Most boats are sailed two-up, however, and class events presently cater for this crew format. The class association organises open meetings, including a national championships and, recently, coaching days. The atmosphere at all these events is friendly, with plentiful advice available for newcomers.

== See also ==
- 3000 dinghy in Wikipedia
