= Kintetsu 3000 series =

Japanese train type

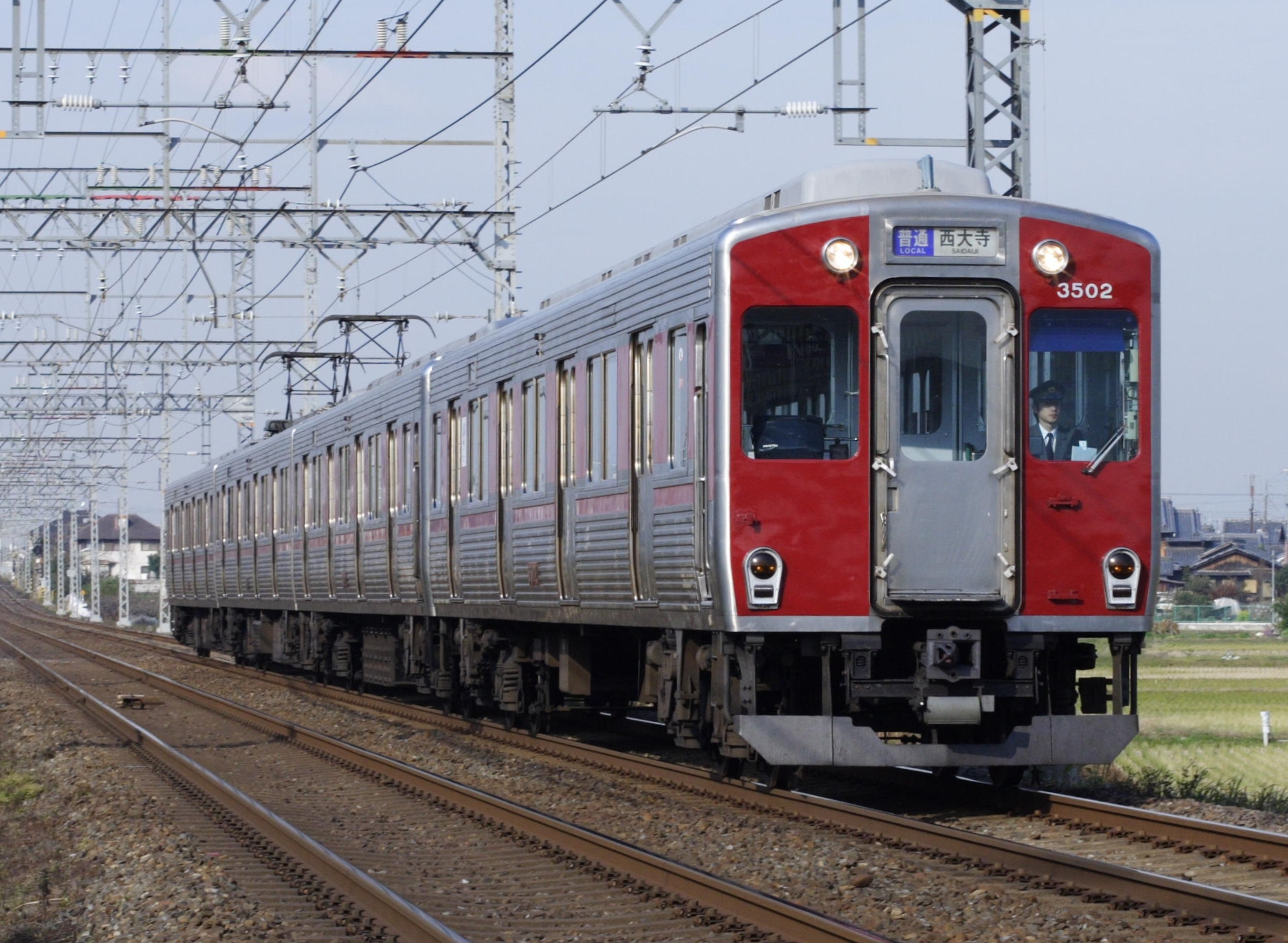
- The 3000 series train in December 2006
- In service: 1979 – 2012
- Manufacturer: Kinki Sharyo
- Constructed: 1979
- Entered service: March 1979
- Scrapped: 2012
- Number built: 4 vehicles (1 set)
- Number preserved: 1 cab end
- Formation: 4 cars per trainset
- Fleet numbers: SC01
- Operators: Kintetsu Railway

Specifications
- Car body construction: Stainless steel
- Car length: 20,500 mm (67 ft 3 in)
- Width: 2,800 mm (9 ft 2 in)
- Height: 4,040 mm (13 ft 3 in); 4,150 mm (13 ft 7 in) (Mo 3001)
- Traction system: Thyristor chopper
- Traction motors: MB-3240-A
- Electric system(s): 1,500 V DC, overhead lines
- Current collector(s): Pantograph
- Track gauge: 1,435 mm (4 ft 8 1/2 in)

The Kintetsu 3000 series (近鉄3000系) was an electric multiple unit (EMU) train type operated by Kintetsu Railway in Japan.

== Formation ==
The train was formed as a four-car set. It was formerly able to run in a three-car formation, but was converted to a fixed four-car formation in 1991, and the cab equipment was removed from the intermediate car.

Car	1	2	3	4
Designation	Ku 3501	Mo 3001	Mo 3002	Ku 3502

== History ==
The set was built in 1979 as a chopper control evaluation train, and was withdrawn in 2012. The cab end of car Ku 3501 is preserved at Takayasu Inspection Depot.

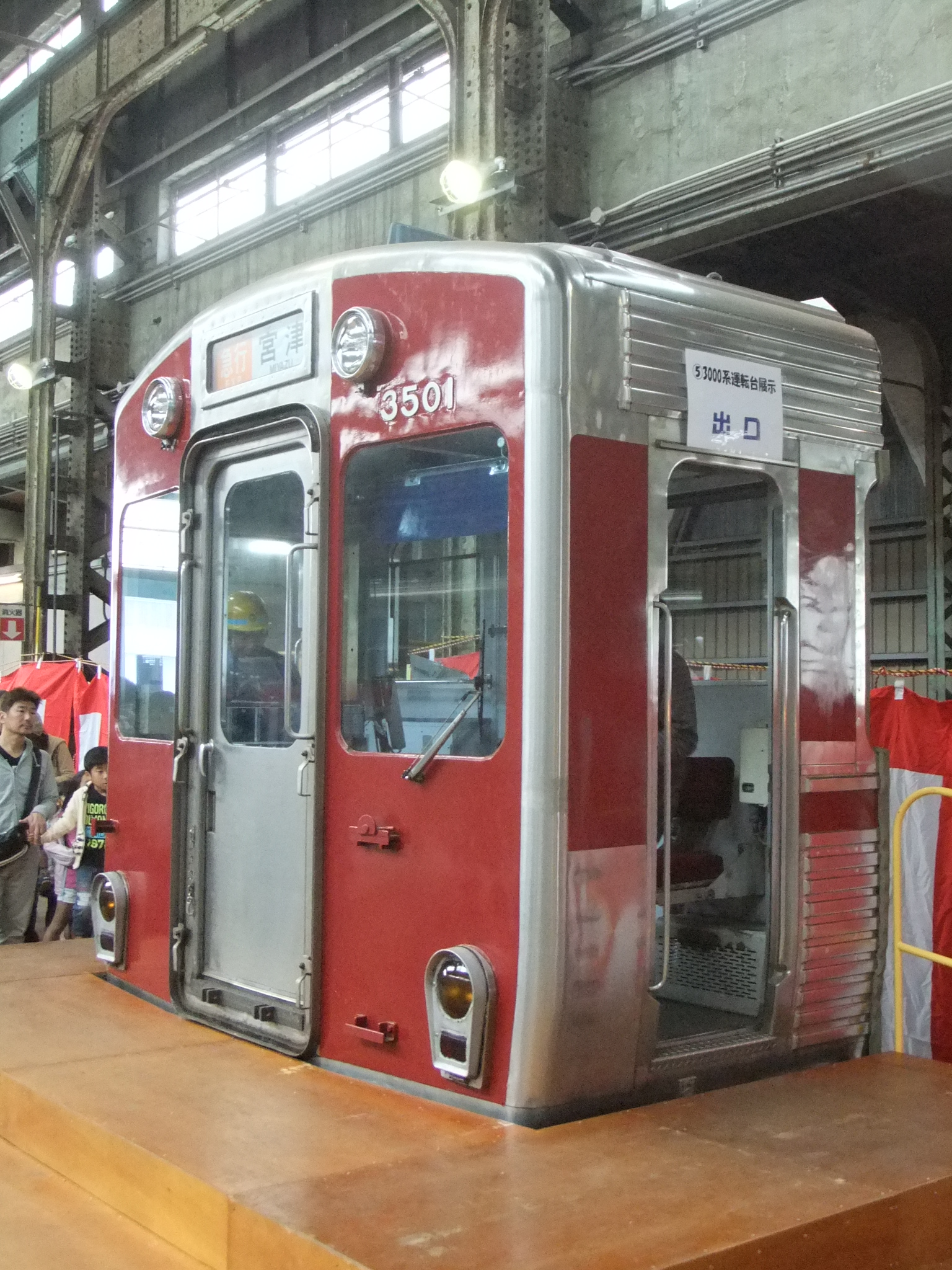
Preserved cab end of car 3501
