= Seibu 3000 series =

Electric multiple unit of Seibu Railway

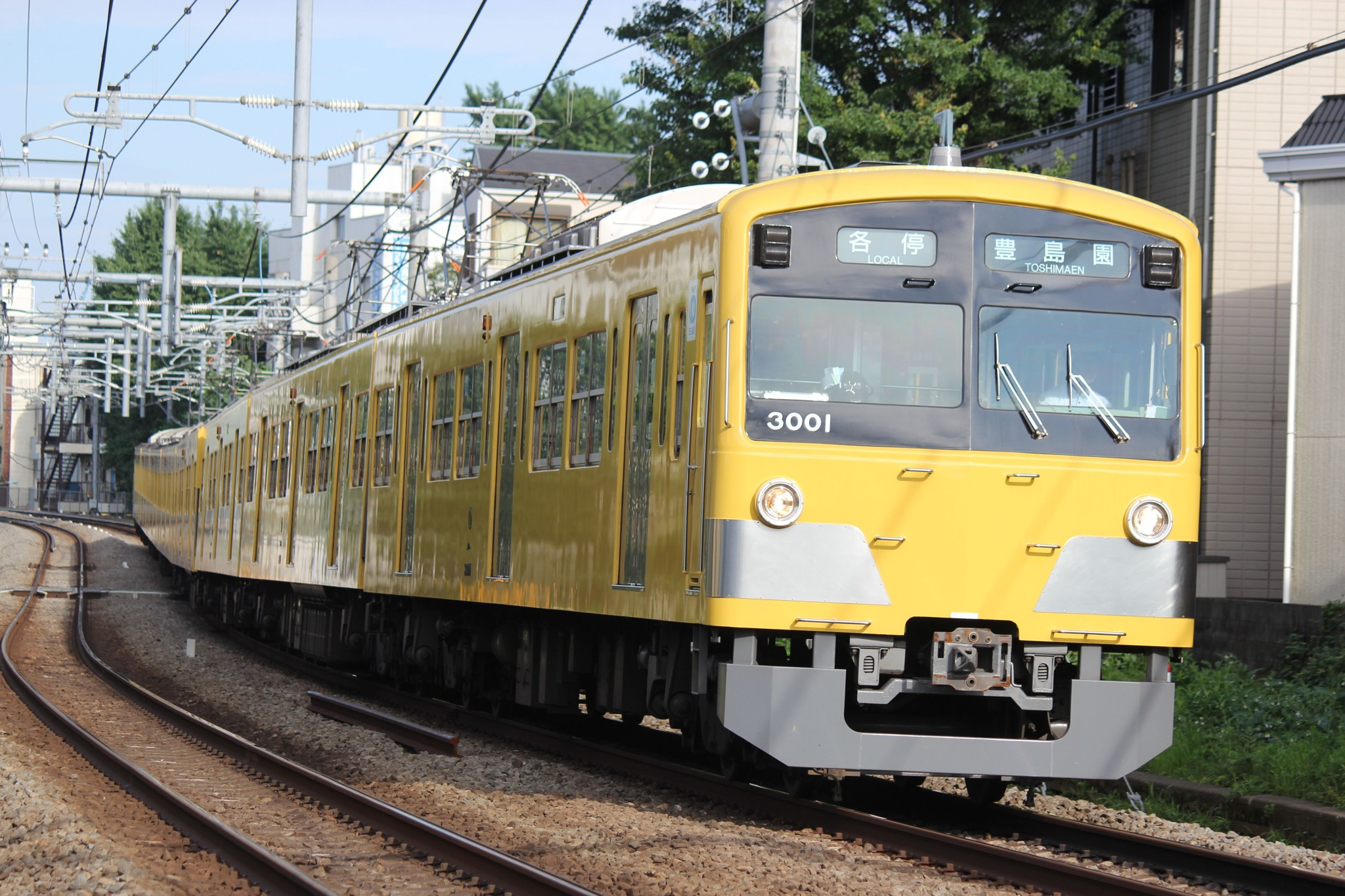
- Set 3001 in July 2012
- In service: 1982 - 2014
- Manufacturer: Seibu Tokorozawa Railway Works, Tokyu Car Corporation
- Constructed: 1982-1987
- Scrapped: 2010-
- Number built: 72 vehicles (9 sets)
- Number in service: None
- Formation: 6/8 cars per trainset
- Fleet numbers: 3001-3017
- Operators: Seibu Railway
- Depots: Kotesashi, Minami-Iriso
- Lines served: Seibu Ikebukuro Line, Seibu Shinjuku Line

Specifications
- Car body construction: Steel
- Car length: 20 m (65 ft 7 in)
- Doors: 3 pairs per side
- Maximum speed: 105 km/h (65 mph)
- Traction system: Resistor control Field chopper control
- Electric system(s): 1,500 V DC
- Current collector(s): overhead catenary
- Multiple working: N/A
- Track gauge: 1,067 mm (3 ft 6 in)

The Seibu 3000 series (西武3000系) was an electric multiple unit (EMU) train type operated by the private railway operator Seibu Railway on commuter services in the Tokyo area of Japan from 1982 until 2014.

== Design ==
Nine 8-car sets (72 vehicles) were built between 1982 and 1987, intended for use on all-stations "Local" services on the Seibu Ikebukuro Line. The trains combined 20 m long steel bodies with three pairs of sliding doors per side, based on the New 101 series design with similar underframes as the 2000 series trains. The trains were originally painted in the same livery applied to the 101 and 301 series trains, consisting of "lemon yellow" with a "warm grey" band around the windows, and unpainted stainless steel doors, but by 1999, the fleet was repainted in all-over yellow. The trains were air-conditioned from new.

== Fleet ==
By 2014, the fleet consisted of two 8-car sets, based at Kotesashi and Minami-Iriso depots for use on Seibu Ikebukuro Line and Seibu Shinjuku Line workings respectively, and two 6-car sets based at Minami-Iriso. These sets were withdrawn from service by December 2014.

== Formations ==
=== 8-car sets ===
The eight-car sets were formed as shown below with six motored ("M") cars and two non-powered trailer ("T") cars.

Car No.	1	2	3	4	5	6	7	8
Designation	Tc1	M1	M2	M3	M4	M5	M6	Tc2
Numbering	3000	3100	3100	3100	3100	3100	3100	3000

- Cars 2, 4, and 6 were each equipped with two lozenge-type pantographs.
- Car 2 was designated as a mildly air-conditioned car.

=== 6-car sets ===
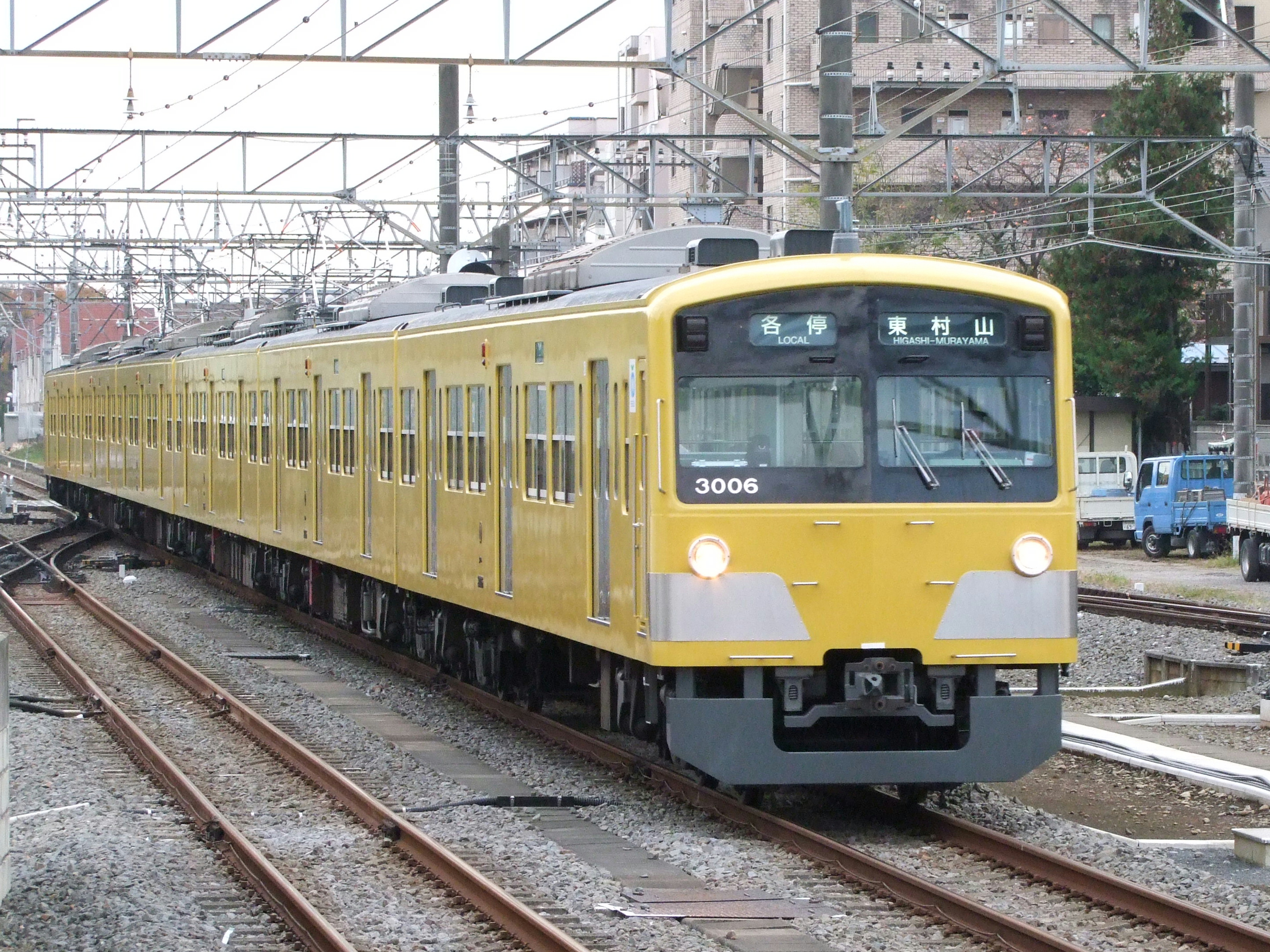
6-car set 3005 on the Seibu Kokubunji Line in November 2010

The six-car sets were formed as shown below with four motored ("M") cars and two non-powered trailer ("T") cars.

Car No.	1	2	3	4	5	6
Designation	Tc1	M1	M2	M5	M6	Tc2
Numbering	3000	3100	3100	3100	3100	3000

- Cars 2 and 4 were each equipped with two lozenge-type pantographs.
- Car 2 was designated as a mildly air-conditioned car.

== Interior ==
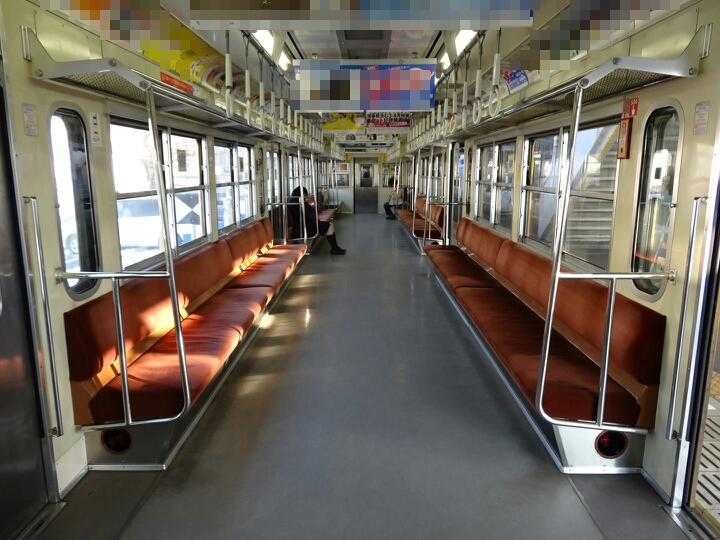
Interior view, February 2014

Seating consisted of longitudinal bench seating throughout. Priority seats were provided at the end of each car.

== History ==
In 2010, sets 3005 and 3007 were reduced from eight to six cars, and the surplus cars scrapped. In December 2014, set 3009 was also reduced from eight to six cars.

The last two remaining sets, eight-car sets 3009 and 3011, were withdrawn from service in December 2014.

== Livery variations ==
Ikebukuro Line set 3011 was repainted in a Galaxy Express 999 livery from May 2009, and set 3015 was repainted in a Saitama Seibu Lions baseball team livery from July 2010 and branded "L-train".

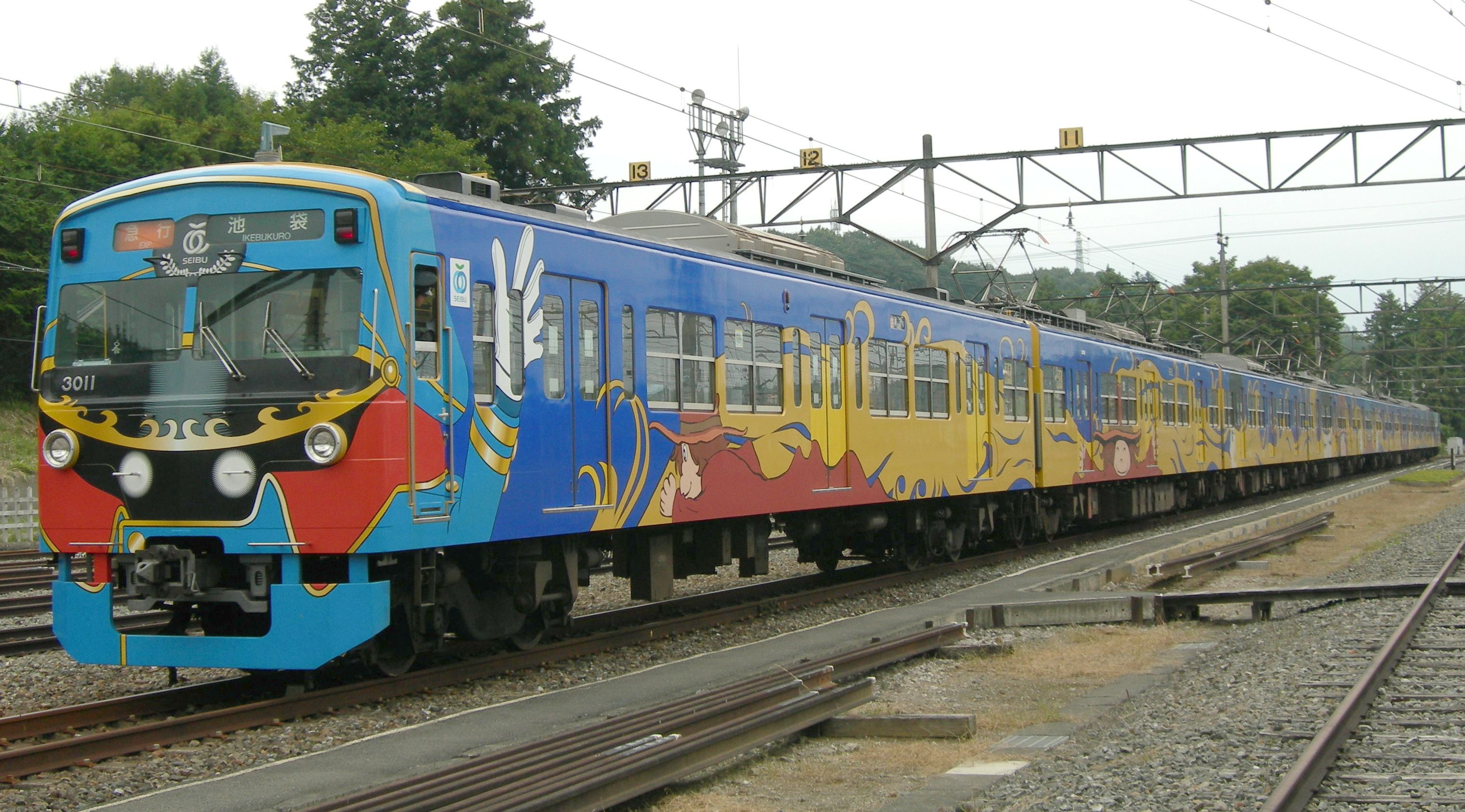
KuHa 3011 (Ikebukuro end) of set 3011 in Galaxy Express 999 livery, October 2010

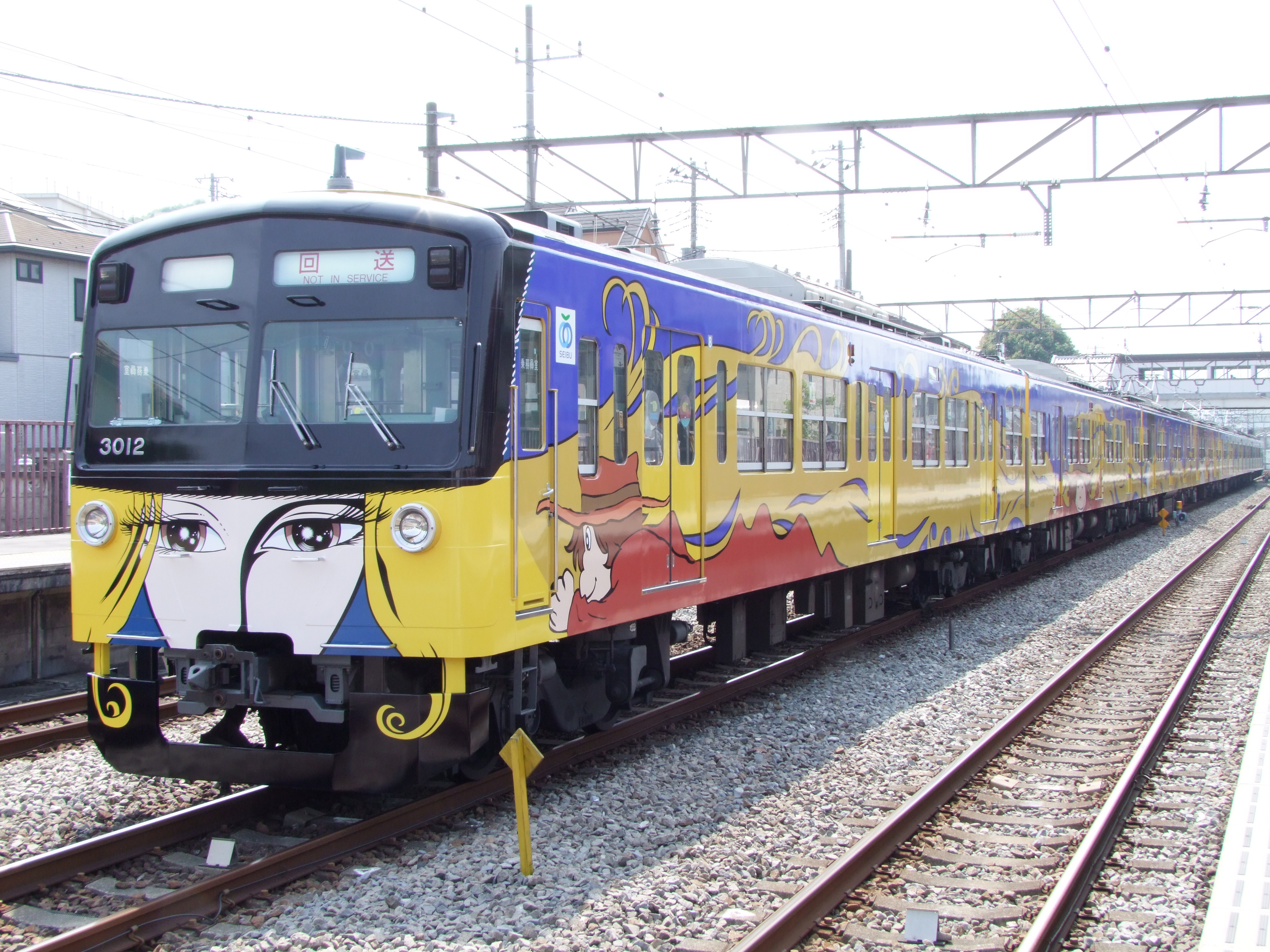
KuHa 3012 (Hanno end) of set 3011 in Galaxy Express 999 livery, May 2009

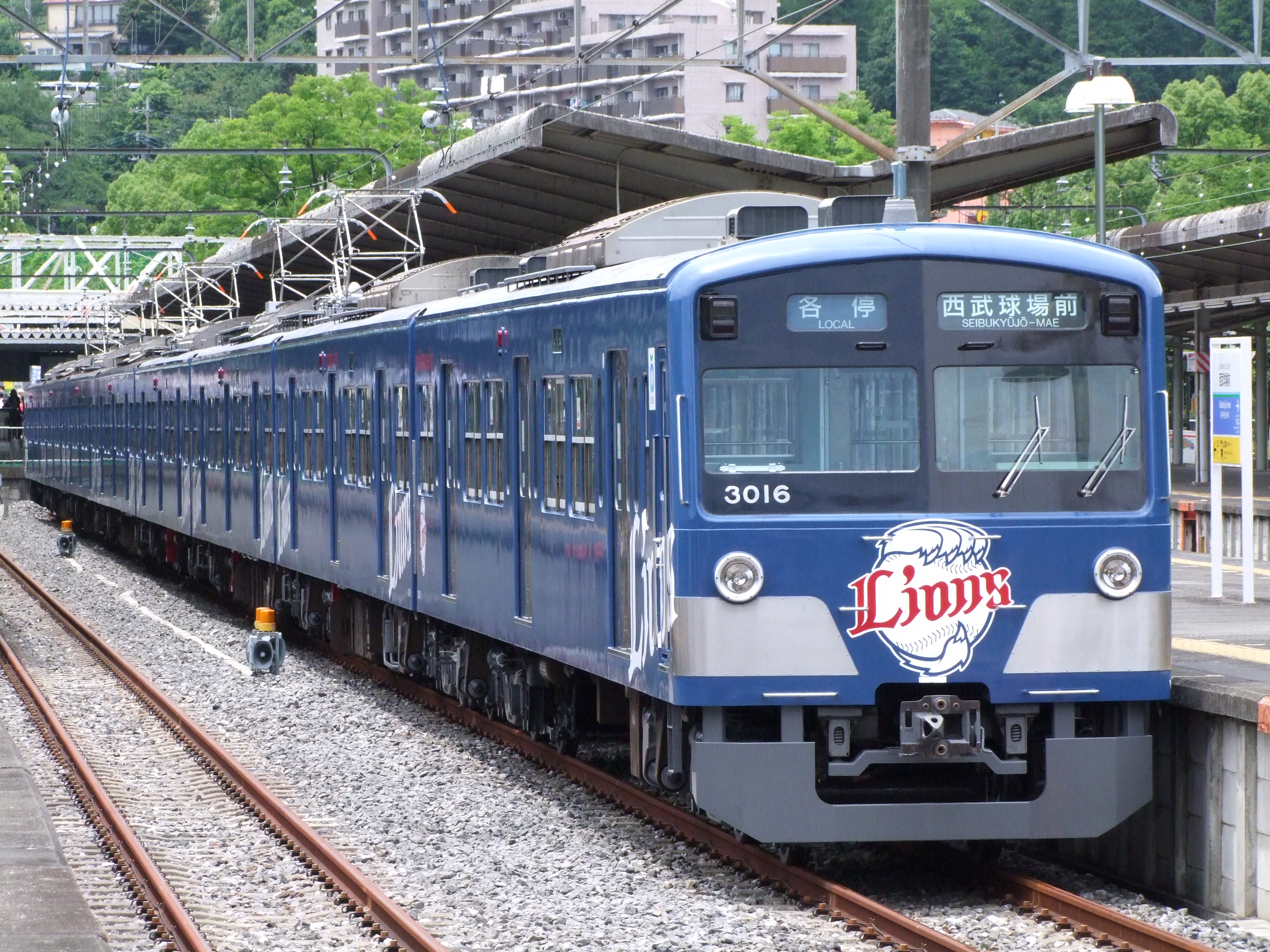
Set 3015 in Saitama Seibu Lions livery, July 2010

== Resale ==
Six-car set 3007 and six cars of former eight-car set 3009 were transferred to the Ohmi Railway in Shiga Prefecture following their withdrawal in November and December 2014, respectively.
