= Keio 3000 series =

Japanese train type

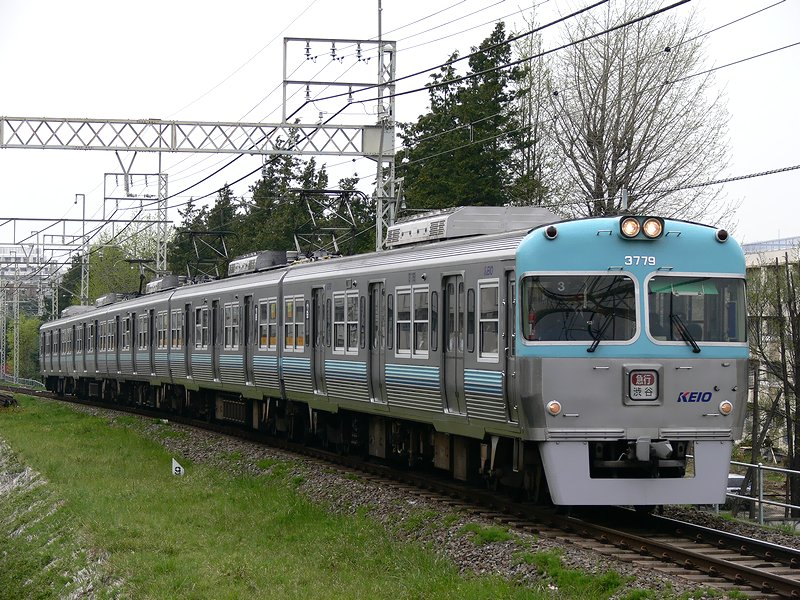
- Inokashira Line 3000 series (refurbished type), April 2007
- In service: 1962–2011
- Manufacturer: Tokyu Car
- Replaced: Keio 1000 series 1st generation
- Constructed: 1962-1987, 1991
- Scrapped: 2008–2011
- Number built: 145 vehicles (29 sets)
- Number preserved: 1 vehicle
- Formation: 5 cars per trainset
- Fleet numbers: 3701–3729
- Operator: Keio Corporation
- Depot: Fujimigaoka
- Line served: Keio Inokashira Line

Specifications
- Car body construction: Stainless steel
- Car length: 18.5 m (60 ft 8 in)
- Doors: 3 per side
- Maximum speed: 90 km/h (56 mph)
- Traction motors: 12 × 120 kW (161 hp)
- Electric systems: 1,500 V DC overhead catenary
- Current collection: Pantograph
- UIC classification: 2′2′+Bo′Bo′+Bo′Bo′+Bo′Bo′+2′2′
- Track gauge: 1,067 mm (3 ft 6 in)

The Keio 3000 series (京王3000系, Keiō 3000-kei) was a DC electric multiple unit (EMU) train type operated by Keio Corporation on the Keio Inokashira Line in Japan from 1962 until 2011.

== Design ==
The 3000 series was the first Keio rolling stock to use completely stainless steel body construction. A total of 29 5-car sets (145 cars) were built from 1962 by Tokyu Car, and in 1963, the design was the recipient of the third Laurel Prize presented annually by the Japan Railfan Club.

Each trainset featured a livery in one of the seven pastel hues corresponding to a train configuration, a unique feature found only on the Inokashira line. A number of trains were later resold to operate on other lines throughout Japan.

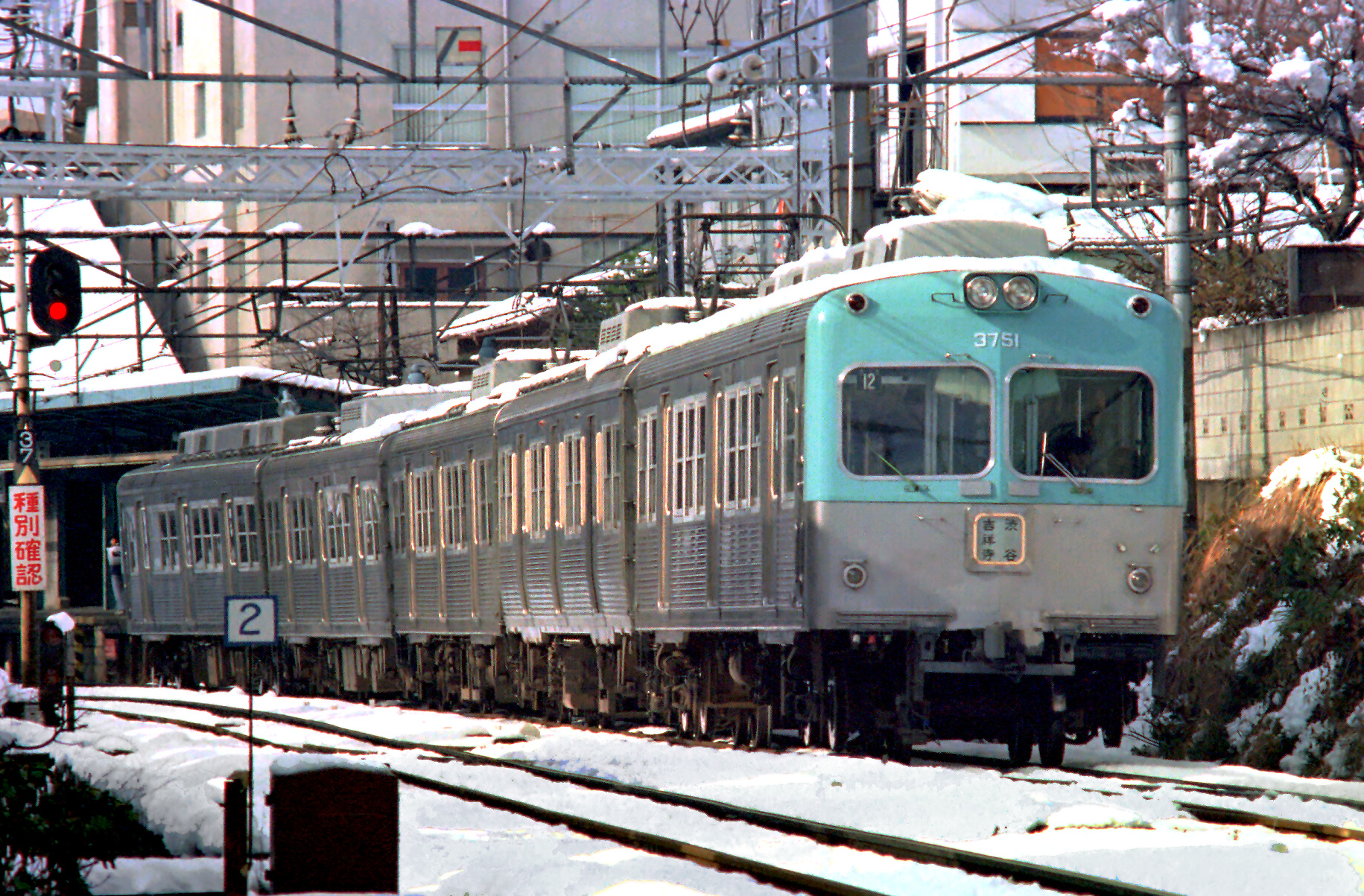
Early, narrow-body set 3701, January 1978

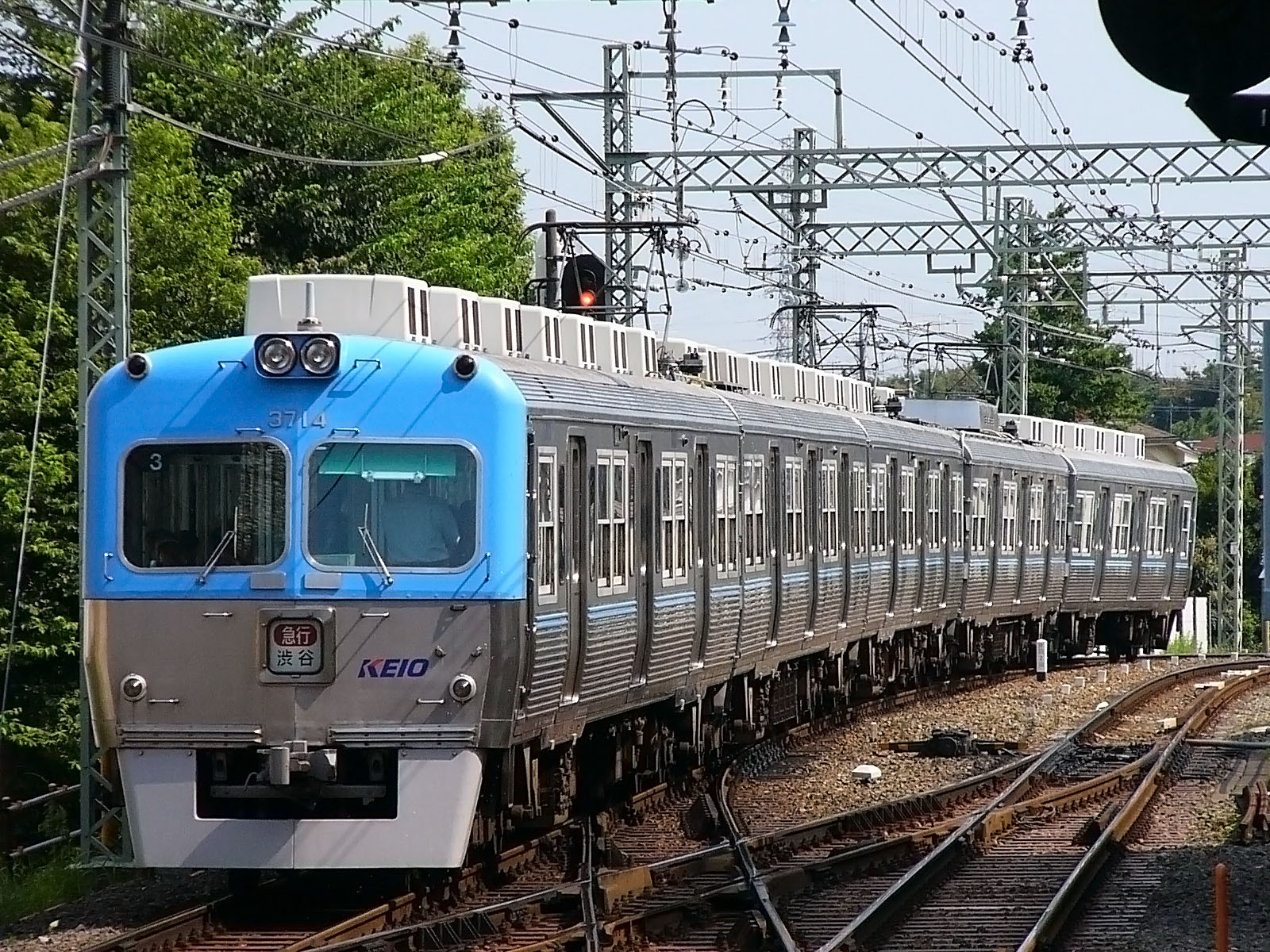
Unrefurbished set 3714, August 2004

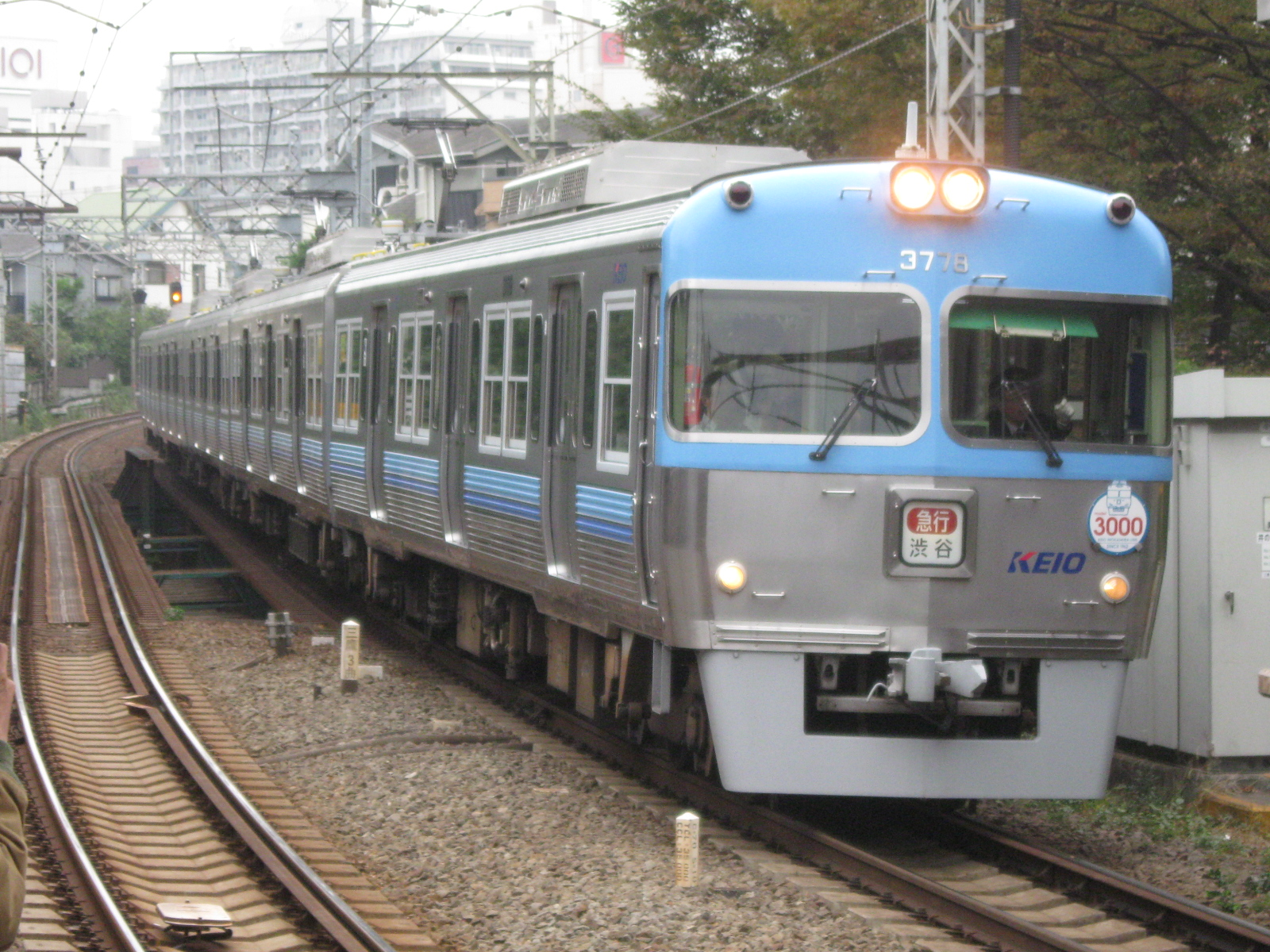
Refurbished set 3728, November 2011

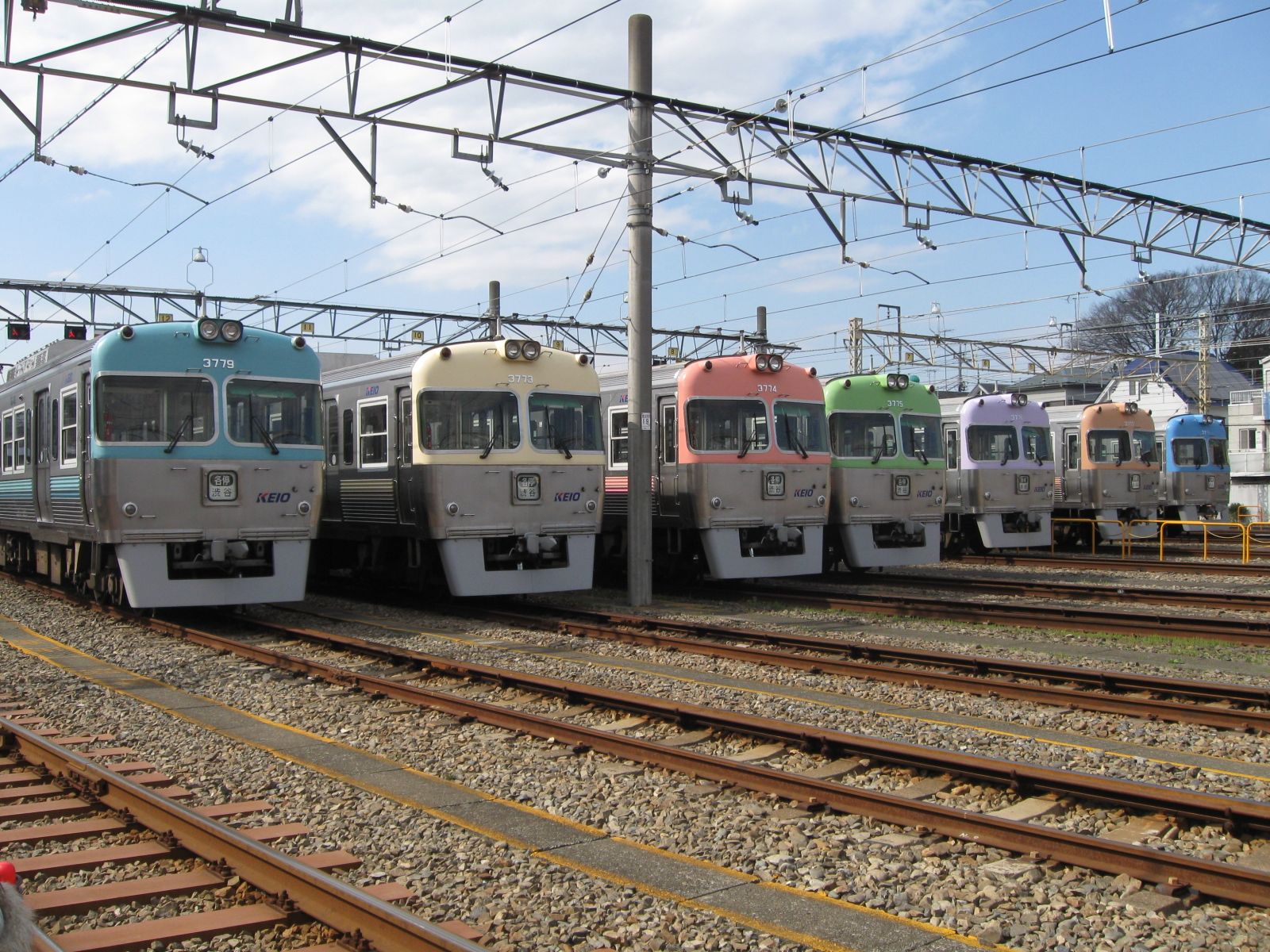
The seven pastel hues (left to right): blue-green, ivory, salmon pink, light green, violet, beige, and light blue

== Formation ==
The five-car trains were formed of three motored ("M") intermediate cars and two non-powered driving trailer ("Tc") cars as shown below with car 1 at the Kichijoji (western) end.

Car No.	1	2	3	4	5
Designation	Tc1	M1	M2	M	Tc2
Numbering	3700	3000	3050	3100	3750

- Each of the motored cars had a single-arm pantograph.
- Car 3 was designated as a mildly air-conditioned car.

== History ==
The first trains entered service on the Inokashira Line in 1962. The fleet underwent refurbishment from 1996, with the original fibre-reinforced plastic (FRP) cab ends replaced by new steel cab ends with panoramic windscreens and front skirts.

== Withdrawal and resale ==
Withdrawal of the 3000 series fleet began in 1996 following the introduction of new 1000 series sets. The last remaining sets were withdrawn by the end of 2011. The withdrawal dates for the later, refurbished sets were as shown below.

Set No.	Withdrawal date
3716	4 December 2008
3717	20 May 2009
3718	15 June 2009
3719	26 March 2009
3720	10 November 2008
3721	4 February 2009
3722	23 February 2009
3723	13 July 2009
3724	7 September 2009
3725	14 October 2009
3726	11 November 2009
3727	2 December 2009
3728	6 December 2011
3729	27 June 2011

A number of sets were resold to other private railway companies, including the Hokuriku Railroad, Jomo Electric Railway, Gakunan Railway, Matsumoto Electric Railway (Alpico Kotsu), and Iyo Railway. In 2007, it was announced that former 3000 series EMUs would be resold to the Choshi Electric Railway in Choshi, Chiba, and converted to two-car sets. However, this plan was cancelled due to the cost of converting the 1,500 V DC cars to 600 V DC operation.

=== Hokuriku Railroad ===
Two early, narrow-body 3000 series sets were resold to the Hokuriku Railroad in Kanazawa, Ishikawa, where they became two-car 8800 series sets 8801 to 8802. Later, wide-body sets were also resold to become two-car 7700 series set 7701 and 8900 series sets 8901 to 8903.

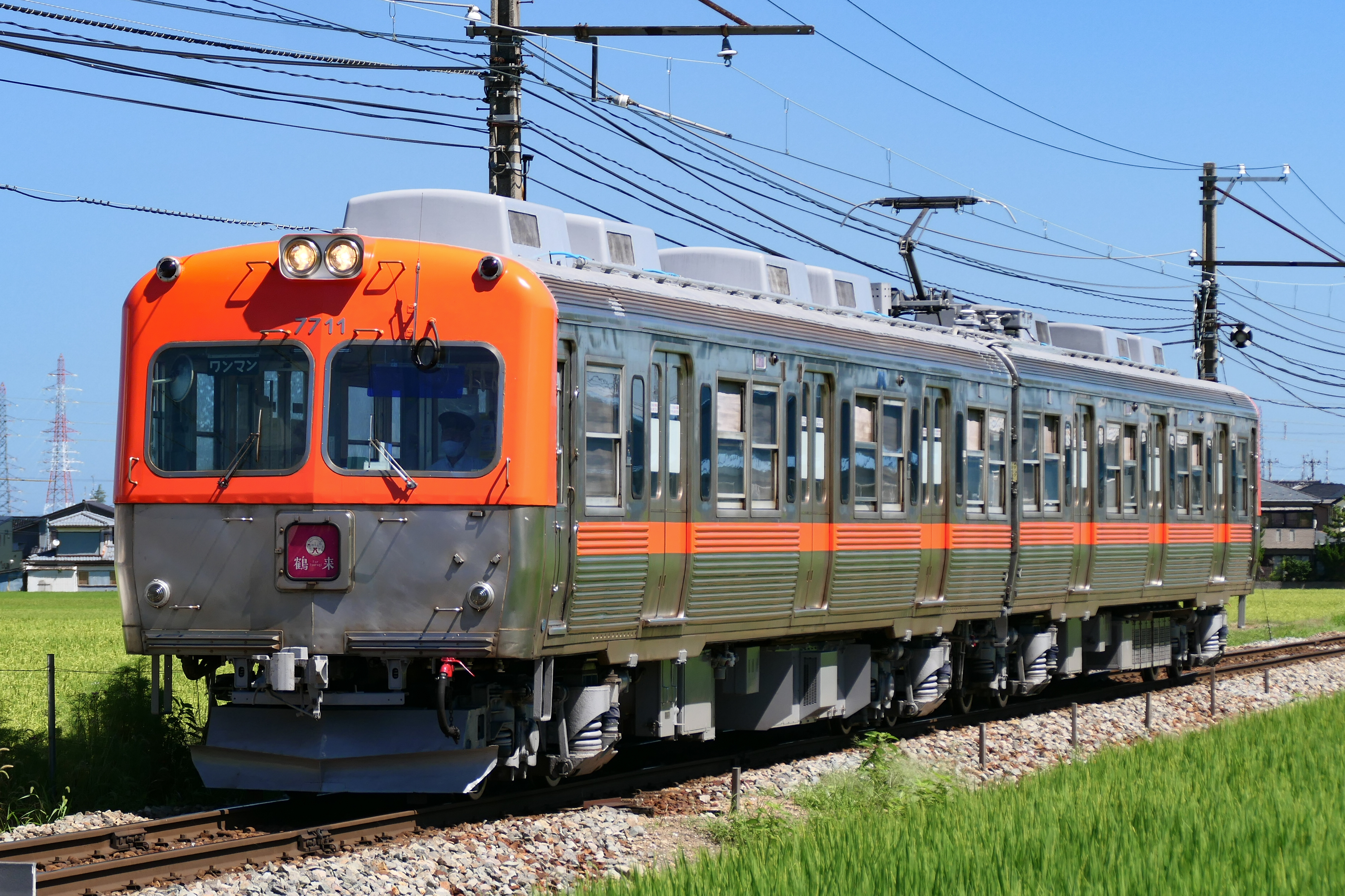
Hokuriku Railroad 7700 series set 7701 in July 2022

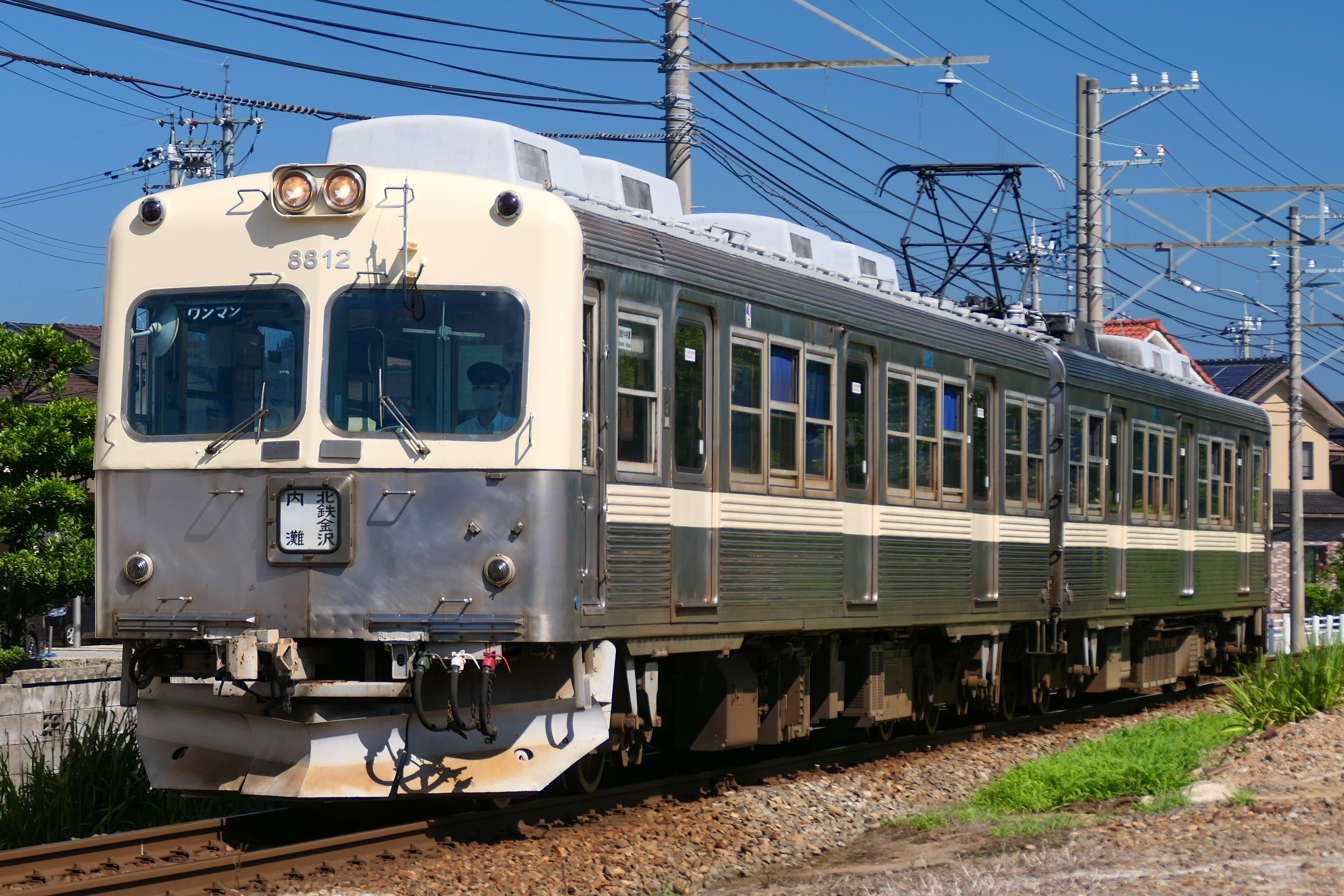
Hokuriku Railroad 8800 series set 8802 in July 2022

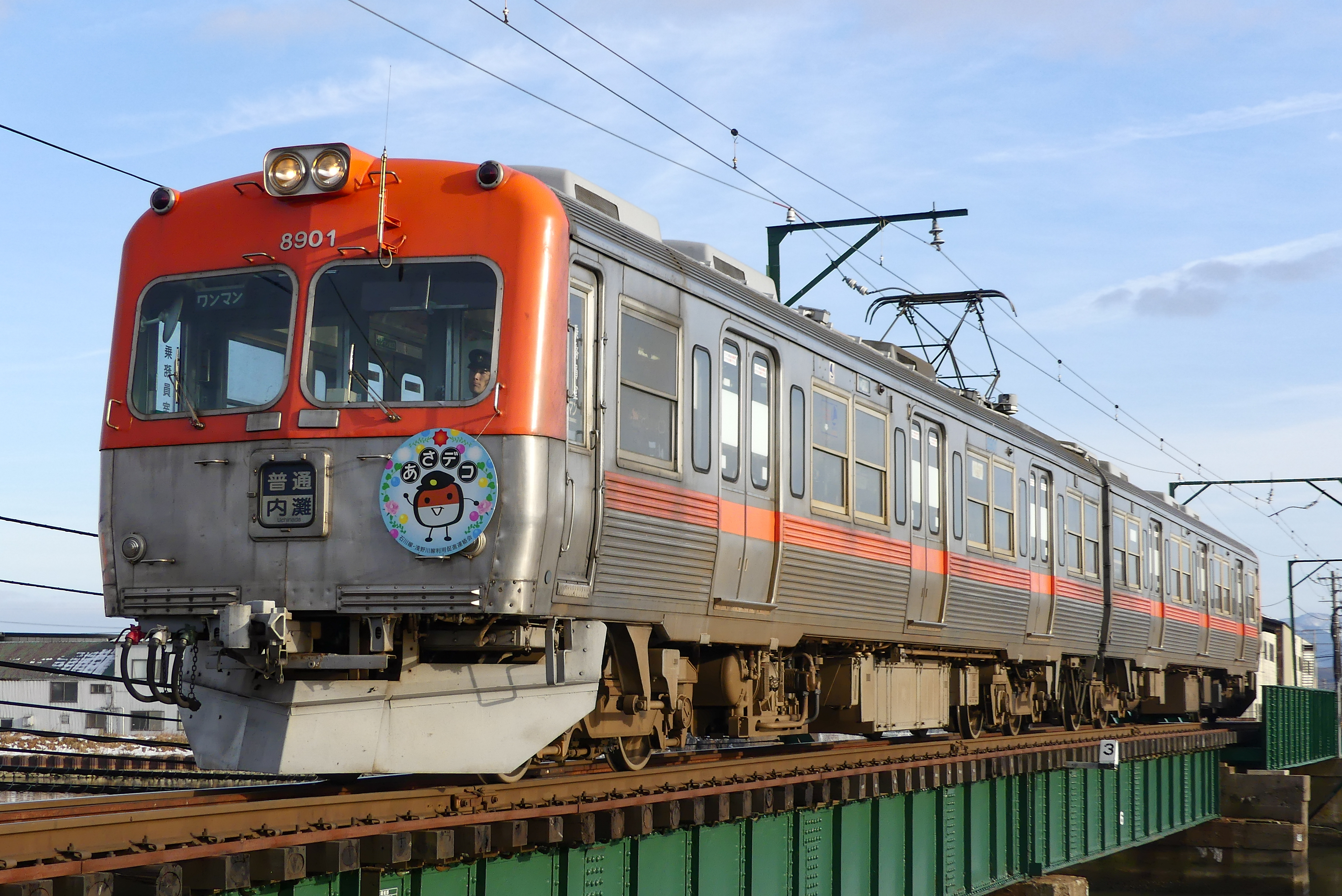
Hokuriku Railroad 8900 series set 8901 in January 2018

=== Jomo Electric Railway ===
Eight 3000 series sets were resold to the Jomo Electric Railway in Gunma Prefecture, where they became two car 700 series sets 711 to 718.

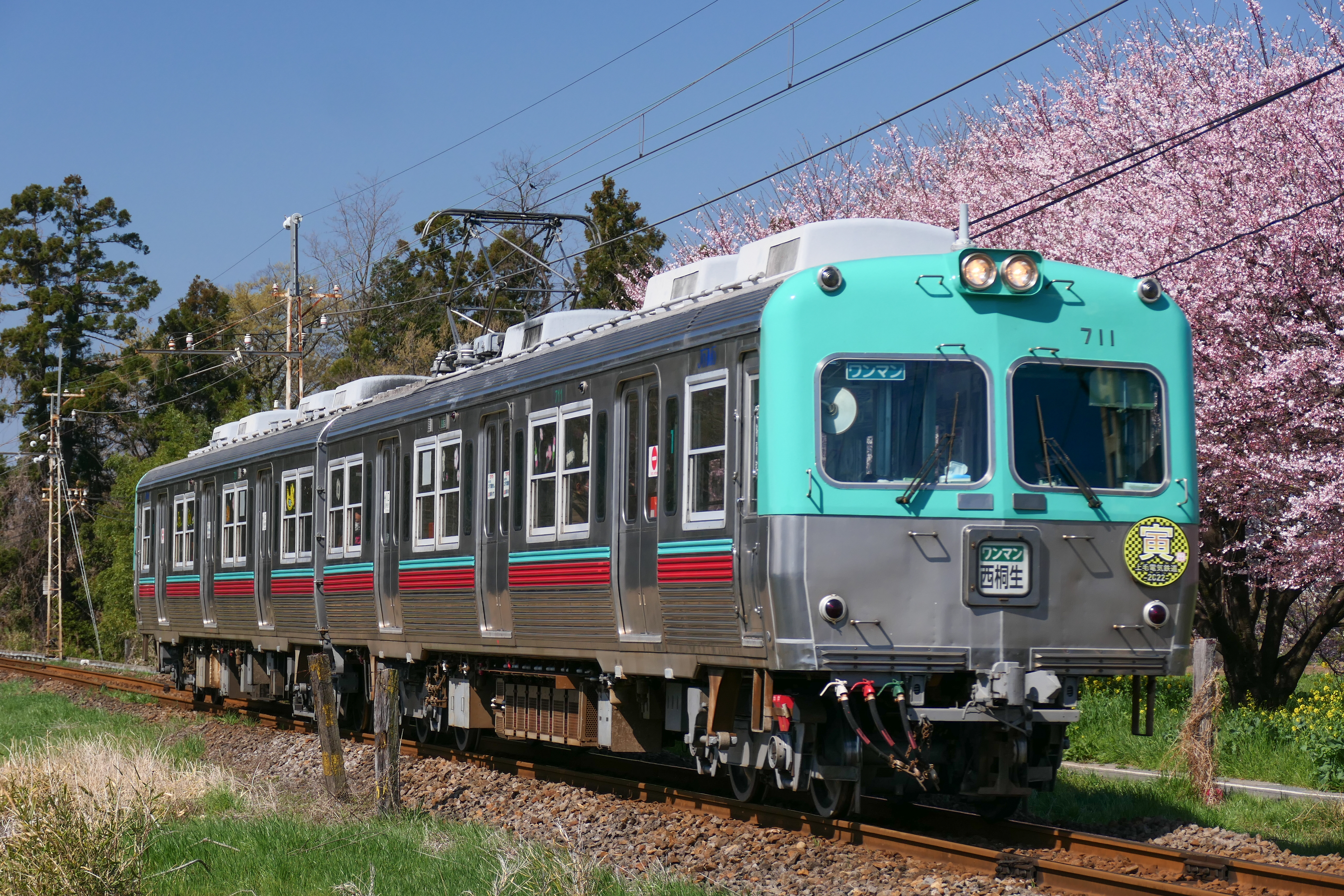
Jomo Electric Railway 700 series set 711, April 2022

=== Gakunan Railway ===
Five former 3000 series cars were resold to the Gakunan Railway in Fuji, Shizuoka, where they became two-car 8000 series set 8001 and three single-car 7000 series units, 7001 to 7003.

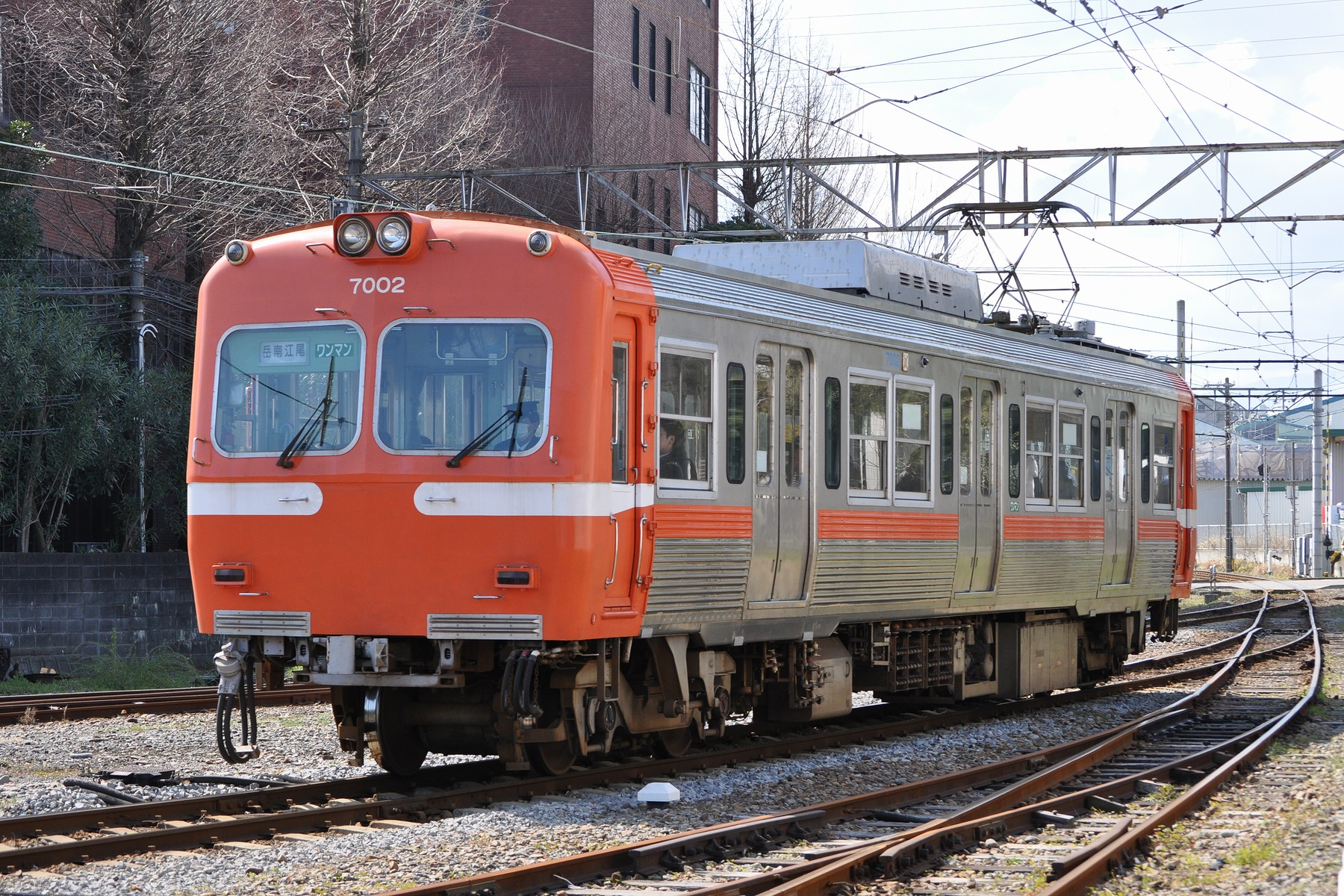
Gakunan Railway 7000 series car 7002, March 2012

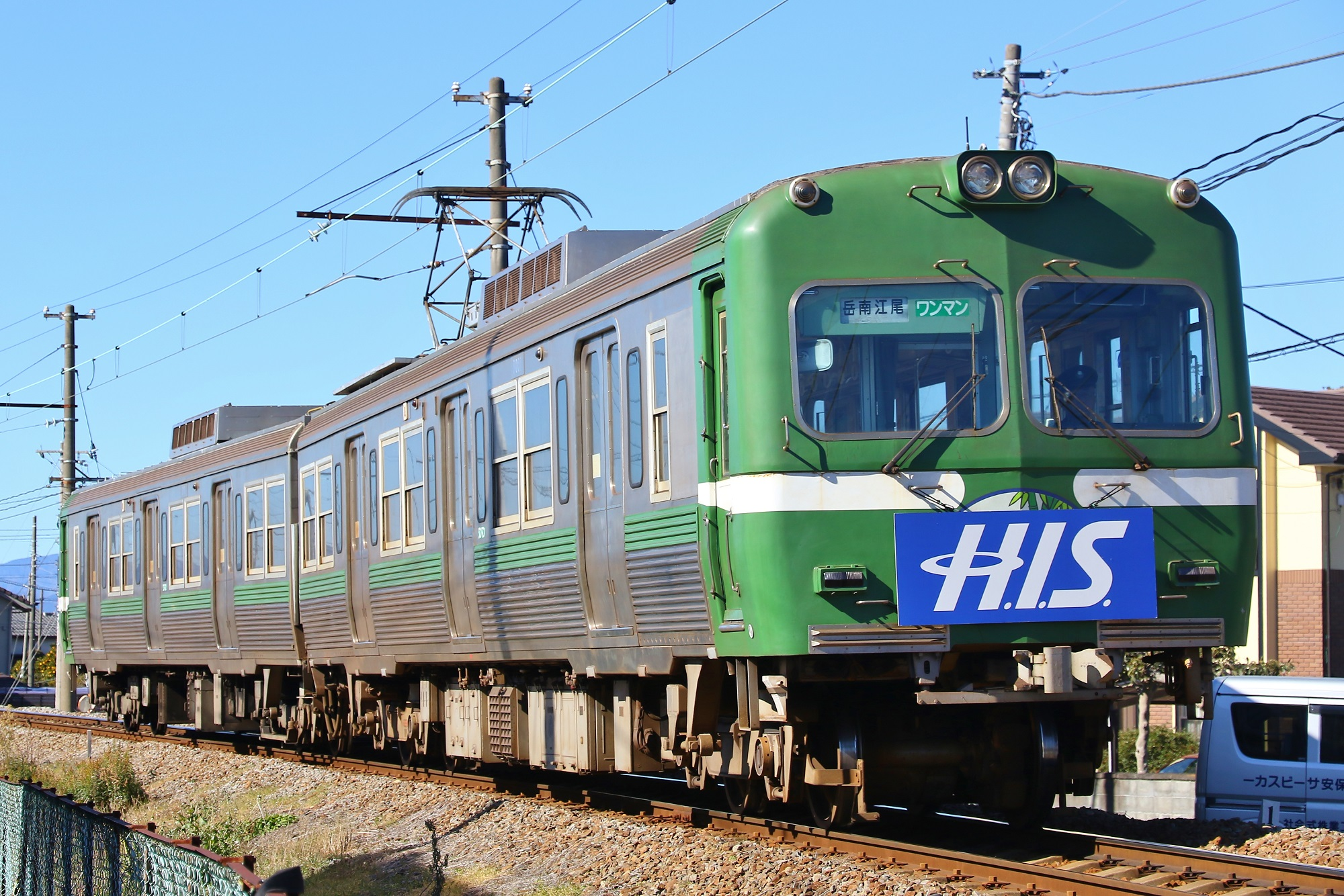
Gakunan Railway 8000 series set 8001, January 2019

=== Matsumoto Electric Railway (Alpico Kotsu) ===
Four former 3000 series sets were resold to the Matsumoto Electric Railway (present-day Alpico Kotsu) in Nagano Prefecture, where they became two-car 3000 series sets 3001 to 3007.

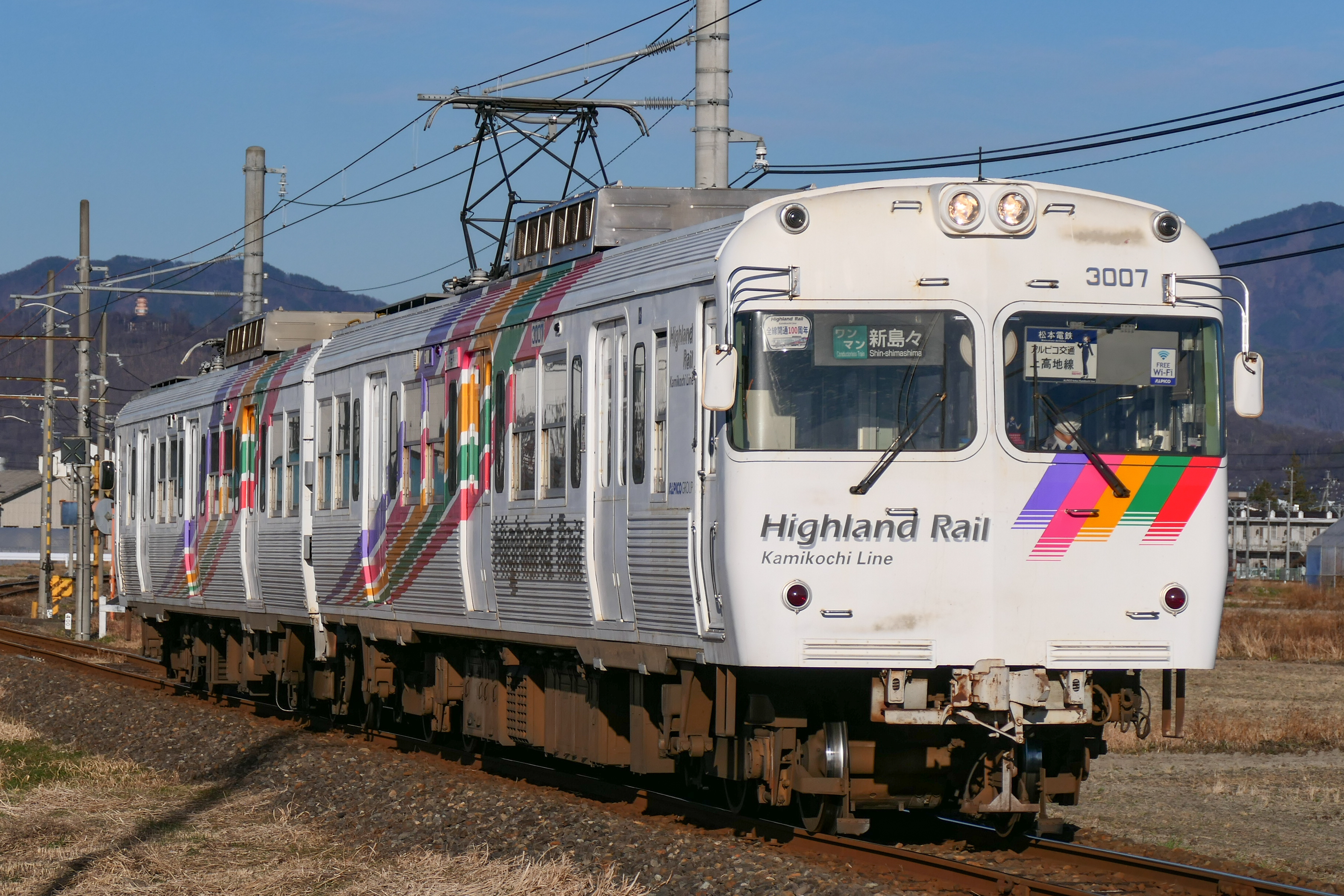
Alpico Kotsu 3000 series set 3007, December 2022

=== Iyo Railway ===
Ten sets, 3720 to 3729, were resold to the Iyo Railway (Iyotetsu) in Matsuyama, Ehime, where they became three-car 3000 series sets 3301 to 3310.

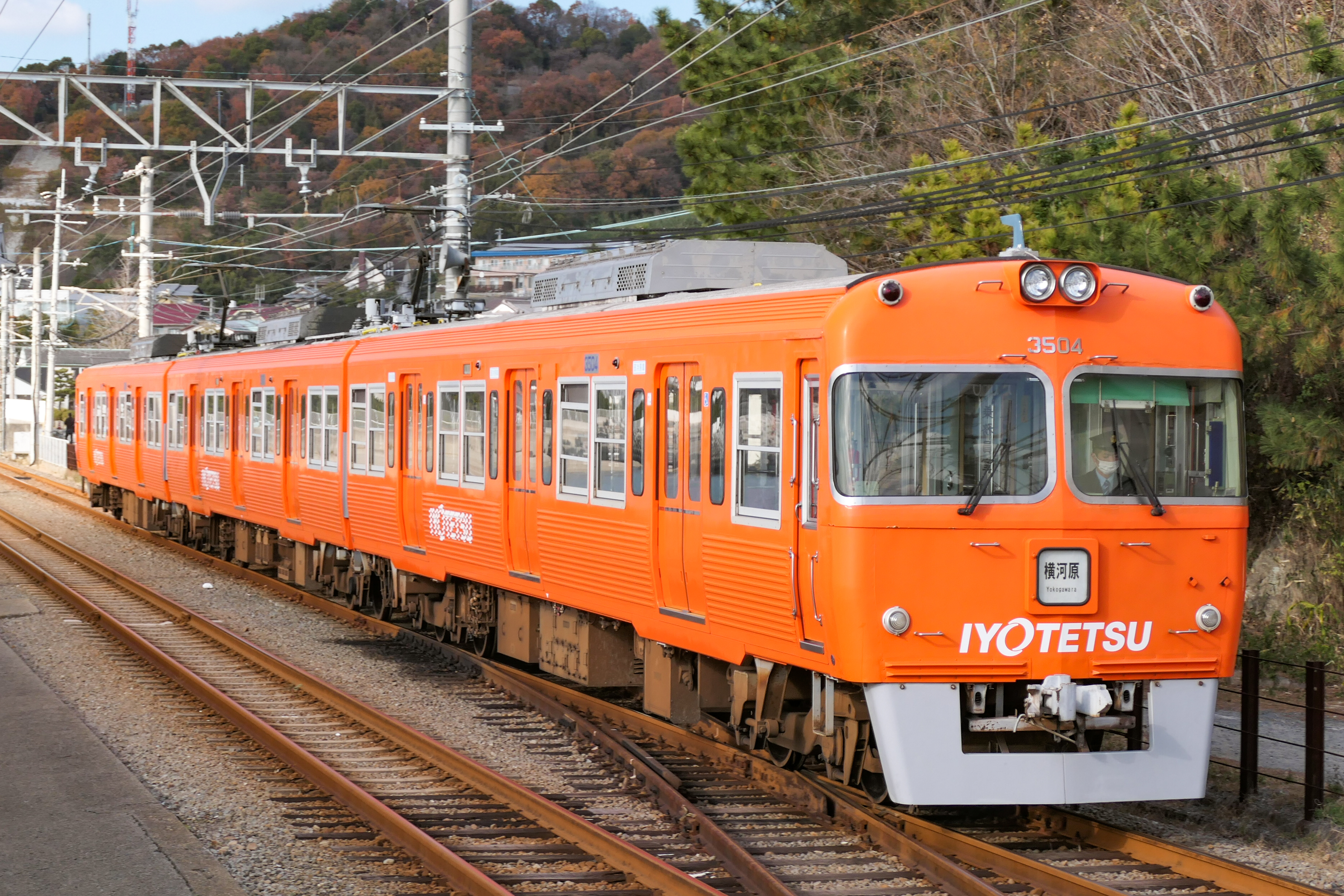
Iyotetsu 3000 series set 3304, December 2021

== Preserved examples ==
Car 3719 is preserved at the Keio Rail-Land open-air museum next to Tama-Dōbutsukōen Station on the Keio Dōbutsuen Line in Hino, Tokyo, which opened in October 2013. Car 3719 was built in 1979 by Tokyo Car, and was withdrawn in March 2009.

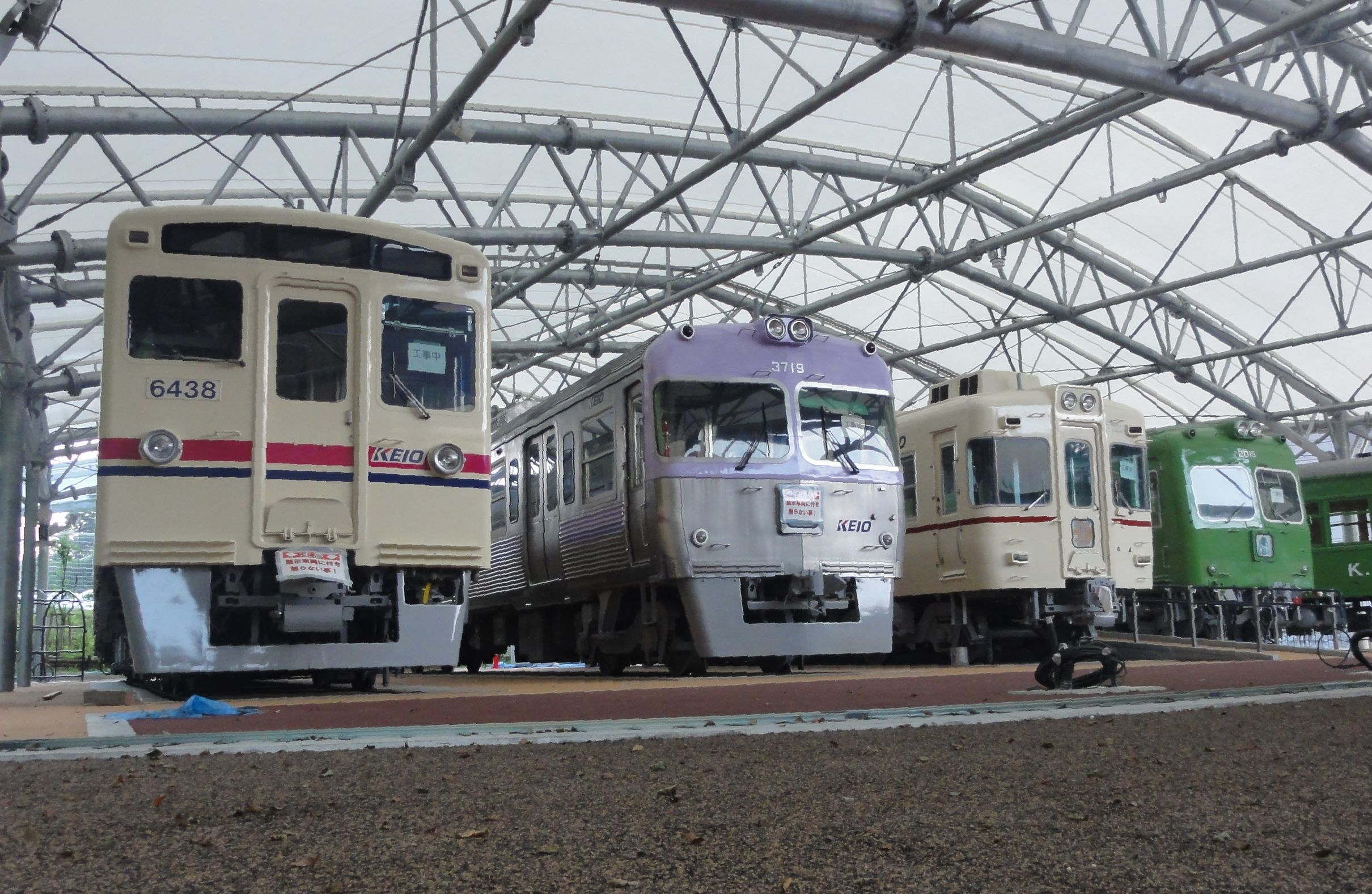
Car 3719 preserved at Keio Rail-Land, August 2013
