= 3000 (dinghy) =

Racing sailing dinghy crewed by two persons with a trapeze for the crew

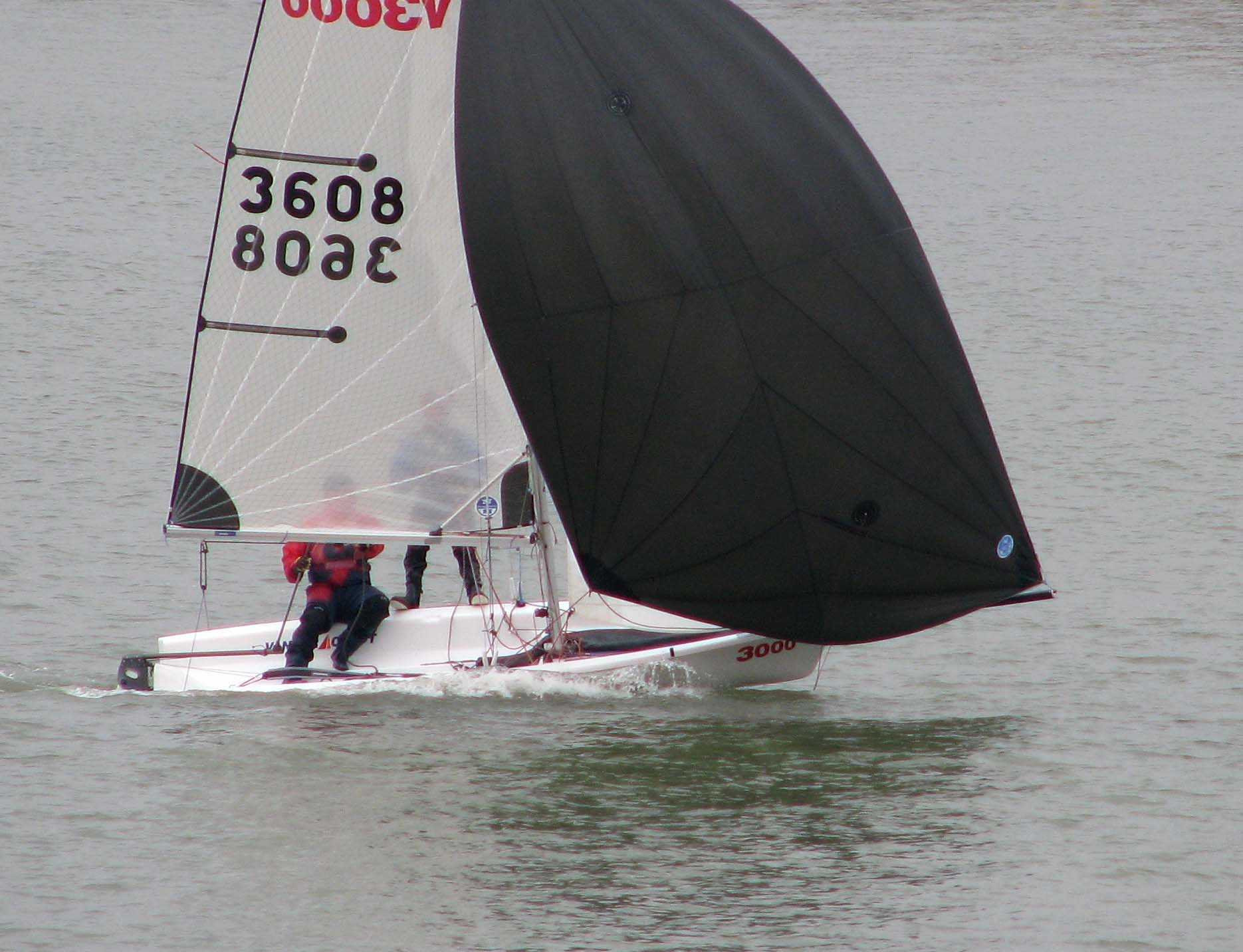
- A V3000 dinghy using both gennaker and trapeze

Development
- Designer: Derek Clark
- Year: 1996
- Name: 3000

Boat
- Crew: 2

Hull
- Type: Monohull
- Construction: GRP
- LOA: 4.40 metres (14.4 ft)
- Beam: 1.46 metres (4.8 ft)

Rig
- Mast height: 6.02 metres (19.8 ft)

Sails
- Mainsail area: 8.60 square metres (92.6 sq ft)
- Jib/genoa area: 3.20 square metres (34.4 sq ft)
- Spinnaker area: 12.80 square metres (137.8 sq ft)

Racing
- RYA PN: 1085

The 3000 is a racing sailing dinghy crewed by two persons with a trapeze for the crew. Launched in 1996 as the Laser 3000, the 3000 was developed from the Laser 2, using the original Frank Bethwaite-designed planing hull combined with a new designed self-draining deck by Derek Clark. Clark also re-designed the rig, using spars and sails from premium proprietary sources and replacing the symmetric spinnaker of the Laser 2 by a larger asymmetric spinnaker (gennaker). The gennaker is chute-launched and retrieved using a single halyard line, and is set on a retractable bowsprit. Helm balance and handling were improved using a shorter-footed mainsail with two full-width battens giving a larger roach. A mast with conventional spreaders replaced the now-unusual diamond arrangement of the Laser 2.

The 3000 class organises racing for both the original boats built by Laser alongside boats sometimes tagged 'V3000' and currently built to the same design by VanderCraft. The latter are constructed from woven glass and epoxy resin using vacuum-bagging to produce a boat which is very stiff and light yet durable.

The mast on current boats uses externally run rigging to enable their being sealed and thus buoyant, reducing any tendency for the boat to invert in a capsize. Other innovations introduced with the boats included a centrally mounted bowsprit, a compression-strut kicker or 'Gnav' in place of the conventional kicking strap or boom vang, and ‘off-the-boom’ sheeting with a take-off block at mid-boom fed from an aft bridle. The latter two rigging variations give considerably more room in the boat for the crew members, and remove any objections levelled at the original boats of being cramped due to their centre-bridle and conventional kicker. The class rules permit all variations introduced since the original Laser 3000 to be retro-fitted to existing boats, which can generally be done with minimal trouble or expense.

While the original Hyde sails from Laser have proved to be still competitive, North Sails now offer an alternative using the latest cloth technology. North jibs are somewhat larger and require mounting right at the bow; a furlable Dacron jib is offered, as well as a Mylar jib which is battened and a little larger still.

The boat is easy to sail singlehanded, optionally using the jib, gennaker and/or trapeze, the latter being easy to use thanks to the deck layout and lack of racks. Most boats are sailed two-up, however, and class events presently cater for this crew format. The class association organises open meetings, including a national championships and, recently, coaching days. The atmosphere at all these events is friendly, with advice available for newcomers.

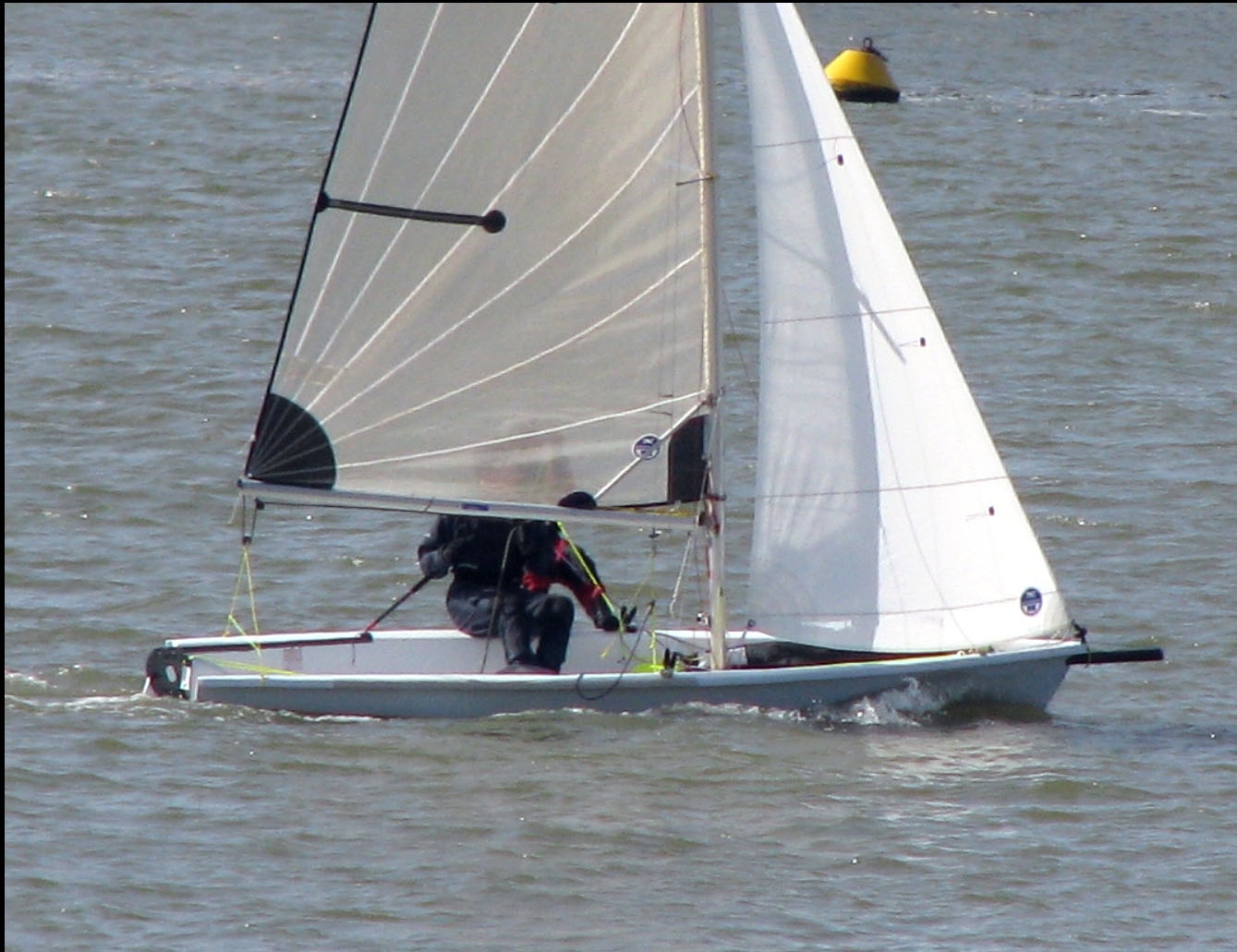
The optional Dacron jib with furler

== Vital statistics ==
Dimensions

- Length 4.40m
- Beam 1.46m
- Mast Height 6.02m

Sail areas

- Mainsail 8.60 m^{2}
- Jib 3.2 m^{2}
- Gennaker 12.80 m^{2}

Weights

- Hull 54 kg
- Trolley 28 kg
- Trailer 45 kg

Portsmouth Yardstick Number: 1085 for Laser 3000; Class recommended 1007 for Vandercraft

== National Champions ==
Year	Venue	Type	Sail	Helm	Crew	Club	Comments
2025	Brancaster Staithe SC	L3000	3124	Josh Donley	Matthew Donley	Grafham Water SC	
2024	Brancaster Staithe SC						Cancelled due to strong winds
2019	Carsington Water SC	L3000	3464	Max Buswell	Will Farrant	South Cerney SC	L3000 (unmodified) wins against V3000s for the first time
2018	Rutland SC	V3000	3602	Matthew Wolstenholme	Peter Wolstenholme	Bough Beech SC	In their own boat
2017	Rutland Water SC	V3000	3604	Nick Arran	Myles Ripley	Carsington Water SC / Sedbergh School	
2016	Rutland SC	V3000	3604	Nick Arran	Alli Williams	Carsington Water SC	
2015	Rutland SC	V3000	3603	Matthew Wolstenholme	Peter Wolstenholme	Bough Beech SC	Borrowed Tony Hunts V3000
2014	Grafham Water SC	L3000	3113	Michael Carver	Henry Hutchinson	Hunts SC	No V3000 entries.
2013	Grafham Water SC	V3000	3602	Peter Heyes	Amy Adams	Wilsonian SC	
2012	Grafham Water SC	V3000	3602	Peter Heyes	Amy Adams	Wilsonian SC	
2011	Grafham Water SC	V3000	3601	Joe Pester	Paul ‘Murph’ Murphy	Ullswater SC	Very windy, several sails in tatters and a broken rudder
2010	Grafham Water SC	V3000	3601	Joe Pester	Paul ‘Murph’ Murphy	Ullswater SC	
2009	Grafham Water SC	V3000	3603	Tony Hunt	Suzanne Hall	Wilsonian SC	The five V3000s took the top five places
2008	Rutland Water SC	V3000	3603	Tony Hunt	Suzanne Hall	Wilsonian SC	
2007	Draycote Water SC	V3000	3603	Tony Hunt	Suzanne Hall	Wilsonian SC	
2006	Draycote Water SC	L3000	3448	Tony Hunt	Suzanne Hall	Wilsonian SC	First Appearance in Nationals for V3000
2005	Royal Torbay Yacht Club	L3000	3144	Jim Hill Jones	Laura Jack	Devon Schools SA	
2004	Rutland Water SC	L3000	3538	Alice Brotchie	Jamie Mayhew	Royal Hospital School	
2002	Rutland Water SC	L3000	3462	James Hamerton	Guy Draper	Royal Hospital School	

== Youth Champions ==
The following are the Youth Champions (U18) for the 3000 Class who compete in the same event

Year	Helm	Crew	Club/School
2019	S Gunning	S Sancar	Sedbergh School
2018	Jac Bailey	Jacob Knock	PDSC
2017	R Copley	G Thomas	Sedbergh School
2016	J Thomas	G Thomas	Sedbergh School
2015	E Barnes	I Van Ruiten	Pennine
2014	E Barnes	I Van Ruiten	Pennine
2013	K Fleck	C Turner-Richard	Sedbergh School
2012	K Fleck	C Turner-Richard	Sedbergh School
2011	P Shellcock	R Shellcock	Sedbergh School
2010	P Shellcock	L Collins	Sedbergh School
2009	B Blake	G Blake	Queen Mary
2008	G McAulay	B Blake	Queen Mary
2007	A Manouchehri	L Howson	Sedbergh School
2006	I Westropp	A Manouchehri	Sedbergh School
2005	A Jack	L Hands	Devon Schools Sailing Association?
2004	H Sharpe	G Butler	Royal Hospital School
2003	J Hamerton	G Draper	Royal Hospital School
2002	J Hamerton	G Draper	Royal Hospital School
2001	C Prosser	G Draper	Royal Hospital School
2000	T Houghton	J Brookes	Devon Schools Sailing Association?
