= Enpuku-ji =

Buddhist temple in Chiba Prefecture, Japan

- 円福寺
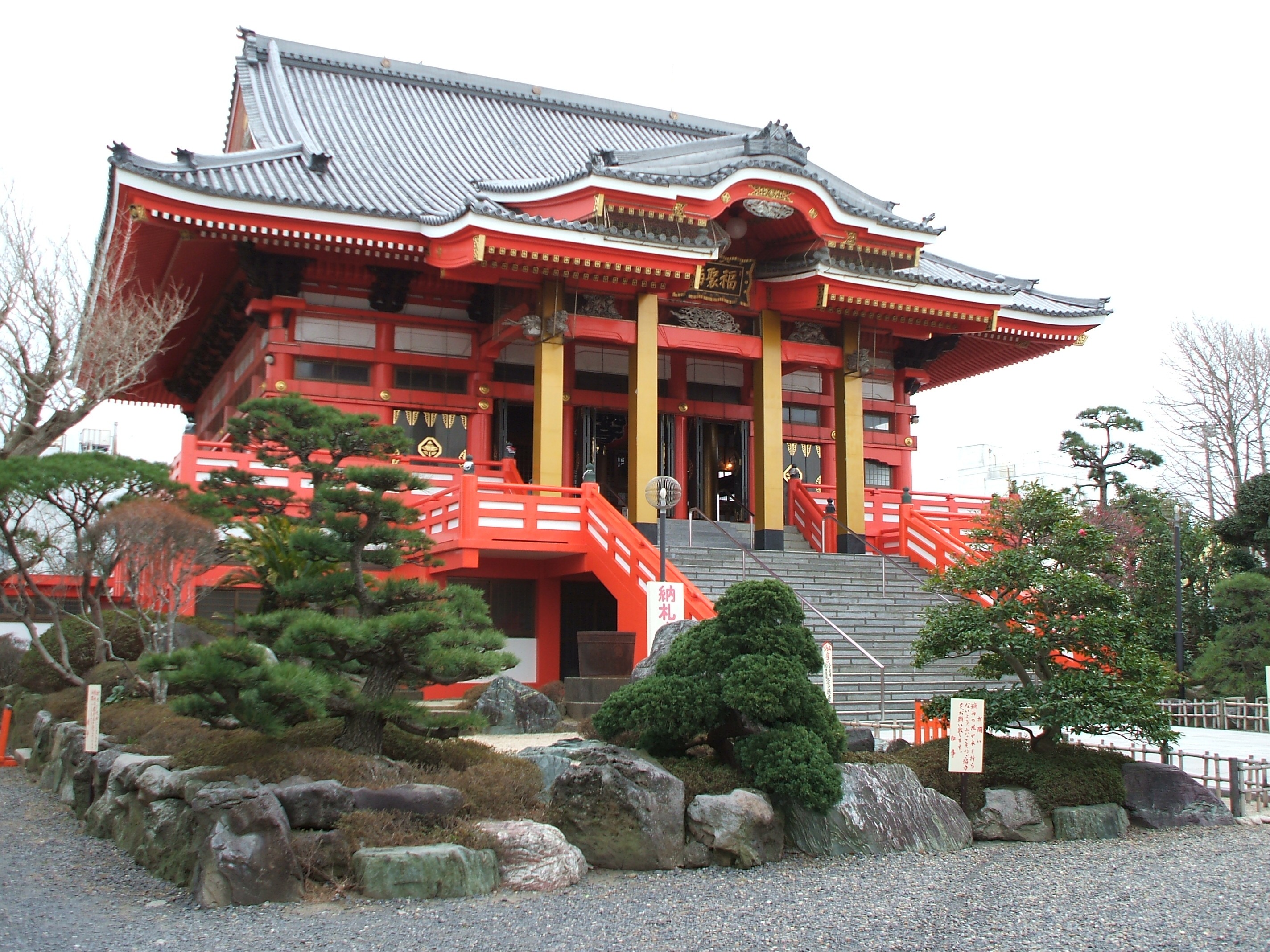
- Kannon-do (Hondo)

- Location within Ibaraki Prefecture Location within Japan

Religion
- Affiliation: Buddhist
- Deity: Jūichimen Kannon Bosatsu
- Rite: Shingon Buddhism
- Status: functional

Location
- Location: 293Baba, Chōshi-shi, Ibaraki-ken
- Country: Japan
- Coordinates: 35°43′55″N 140°50′26.2″E

Architecture
- Founder: c.Kūkai
- Completed: c.Kōnin era (810-824)
- Important Cultural Property

Enpuku-ji (円福寺) is a Buddhist temple located in the Baba neighborhood of the city of Chōshi, Chiba Prefecture, Japan. It is an independent temple under Shingon Buddhism and its honzon is a statue of Jūichimen Kannon Bosatsu, also popularly known as the Iinuma Kannon (飯沼観音). The temples full name is Iinuma-zan Enpuku-ji (飯沼山円福寺). The temple is the 27th stop on the Bandō Sanjūsankasho pilgrimage route.

== Overview ==
The origins of this temple are uncertain. According to the temple's legend, two fishermen scooped up a statue of the Jūichimen Kannon in their nets in the first year of the Jinki era (724) and became monks. During the Tenpyō era (729-749) the wandering priest Gyōki heard this story and made an altar. However, when it was completed, the altar was a little too small, so the statue bowed its head and entered the altar by itself. Later, Kūkai, who visited this area during the Kōnin era (810-824), constructed a temple.

After the Kamakura period, the temple flourished as a result of the devotion of the local Kaijō clan who ruled this area. In 1591, Tokugawa Ieyasu gave the temple a red seal and the various halls were maintained. The Kannon-do was built in 1578, but extensively renovated in 1773, and other buildings, such as a Niōmon and Tahōtō were constructed.

Most of the temple was destroyed in 1945 in the Chōshi air raids, and its current structures are all post-war reconstructions.

The five-story pagoda at the temple was completed in 2009 and is 33.55 meters tall.

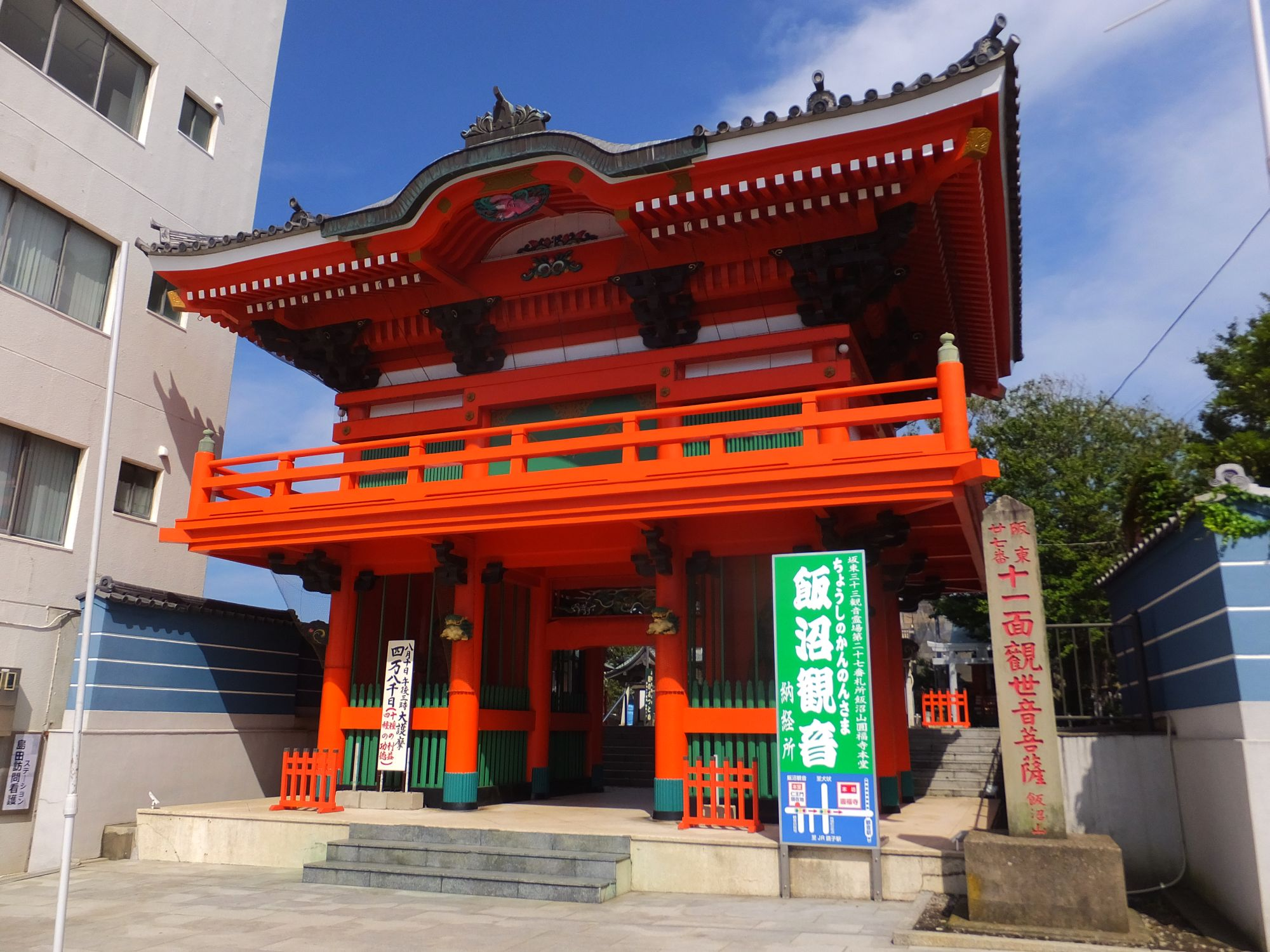
Sanmon

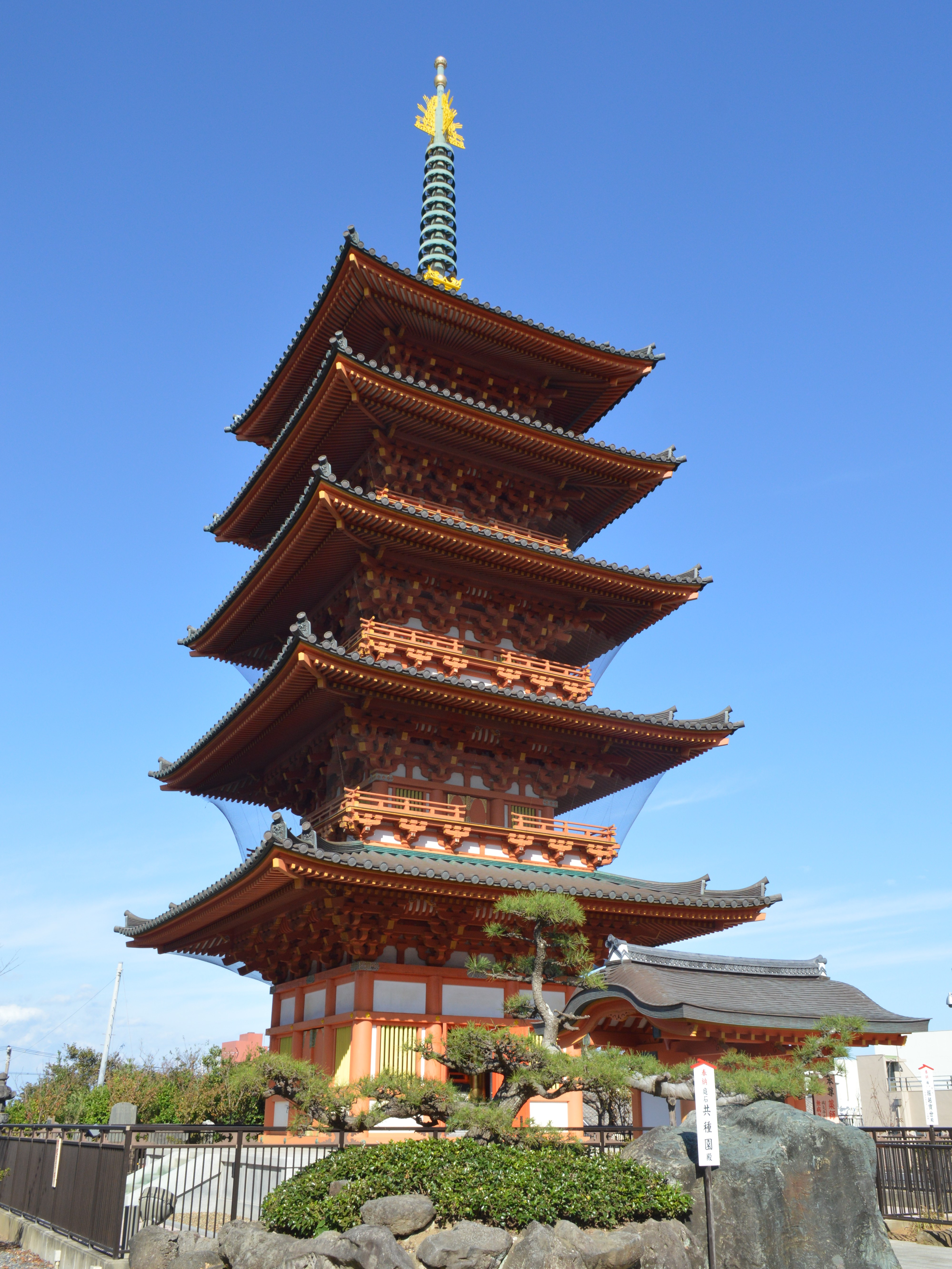
Pagoda

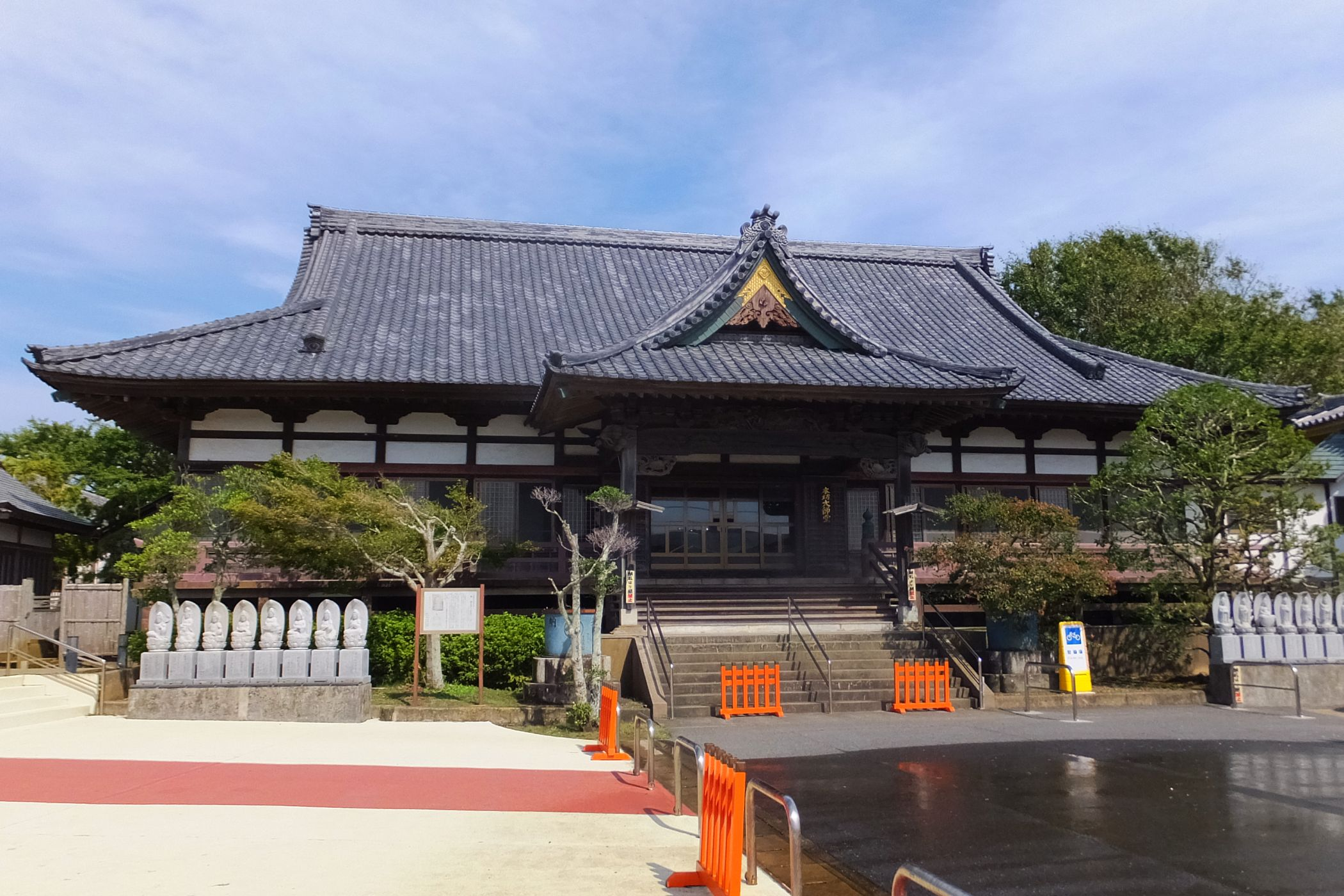
Daishi-do

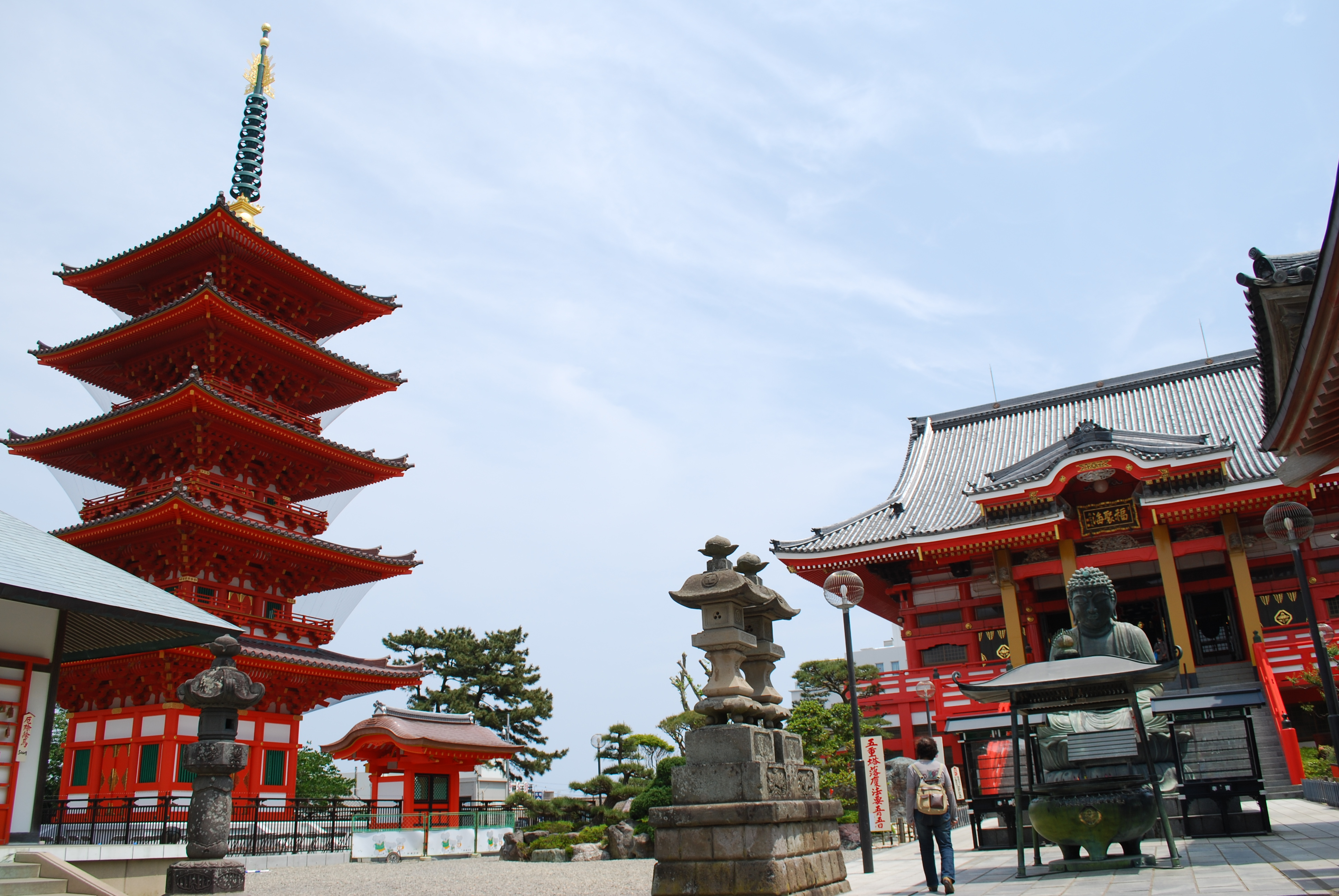
Precincts

== Bandō Sanjūsankasho (Bandō 33 temple pilgrimage) ==
The temple is the 27th temple on the 33 temple Bandō Sanjūsankasho pilgrimage route.

== Access ==
The temple is a five-minute walk from Kannon Station on the Choshi Electric Railway Line.

== Cultural Properties ==
=== National Important Cultural Properties ===
- Nyō (鐃), an early Heian period cast-bronze gong used for Buddhist rituals. Currently housed at the Nara National Museum. Designated a National Important Cultural Property.

=== Chiba Prefectural Important Cultural Properties ===
- Temple bell (梵鐘, bonshō) carrying the nengō "Kyōtoku 11" (i.e., the 11th year of the Kyōtoku period, 1462)
- Shaka Nehan-zu (釈迦涅槃図), Edo Period (1663); a 354.6 cm x width Buddhist scroll in three parts
