= Nakanochō Station =

Railway station in Chōshi, Chiba Prefecture, Japan

Nakanochō Station 仲ノ町駅
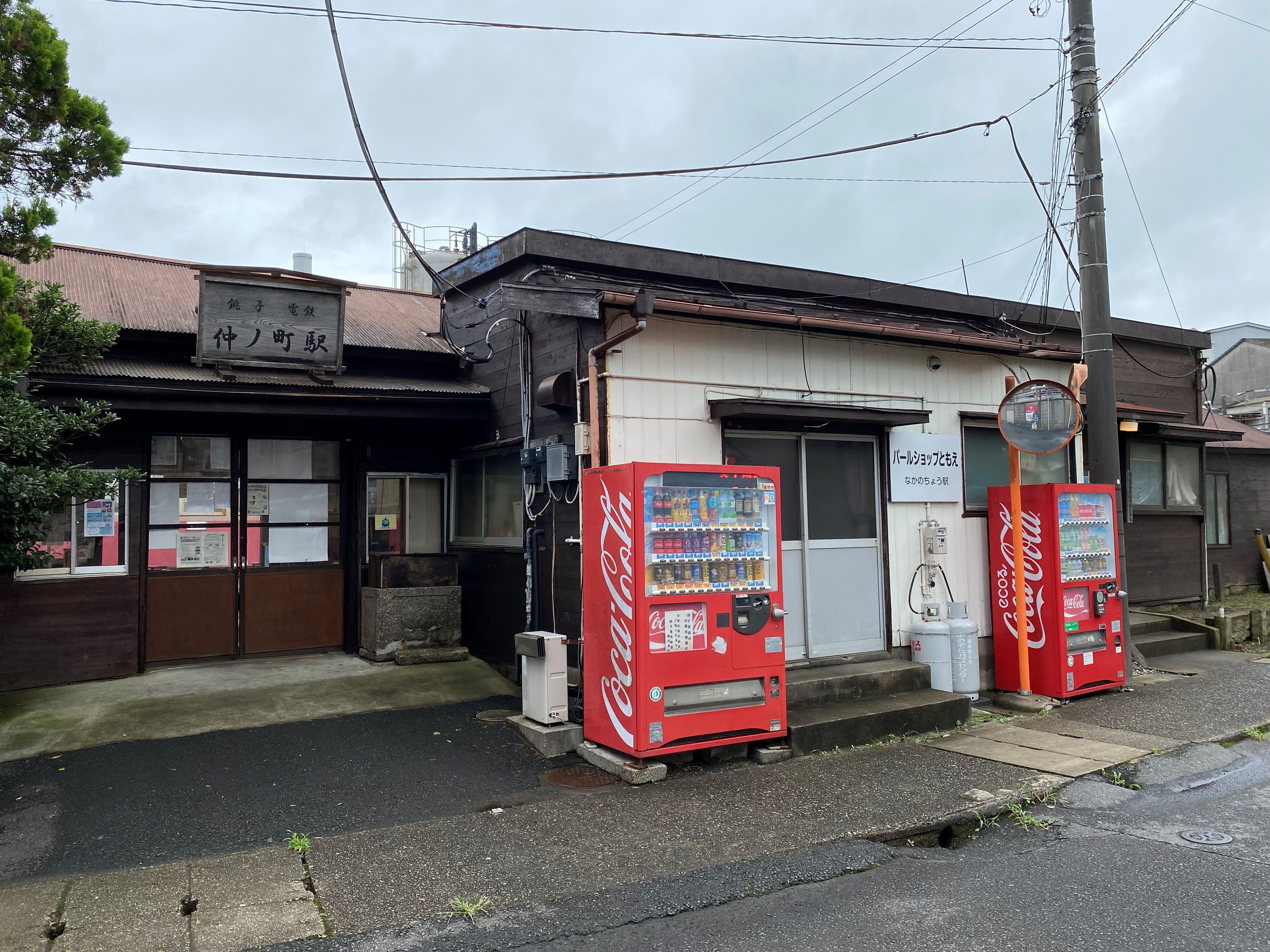
- The station building in August 2021

General information
- Location: 2-297 Araoi-chō, Chōshi-shi, Chiba-ken 288-0056; Japan
- Coordinates: 35°43′44″N 140°50′01″E
- Elevation: 4.3 m (14 ft)
- Operator: Choshi Electric Railway
- Line: Choshi Electric Railway Line
- Distance: 0.5 km from Chōshi
- Platforms: 1 (1 side platform)
- Tracks: 1

Construction
- Parking: Yes

Other information
- Status: Staffed
- Station code: CD02

History
- Opened: December 1913

Passengers
- FY2010: 44 daily

Services
Preceding station	Choshi Electric Railway	Following station
Chōshi Terminus	Chōshi Electric Railway Line	Kannon towards Tokawa
Location
- Location within Chiba Prefecture Location within Japan

Nakanochō Station (仲ノ町駅, Nakanochō-eki) is a railway station on the privately operated Chōshi Electric Railway Line in Chōshi, Chiba, Japan.

== Lines ==
Nakanochō Station is served by the 6.4 km (4.0 mi) Chōshi Electric Railway Line from Chōshi to Tokawa, and is located 0.5 km (0.31 mi) from Chōshi Station.

== Station layout ==
The station consists of one side platform serving a single track with a passing loop. The line's maintenance depot and storage yard is located immediately adjacent to the station. The station is staffed.

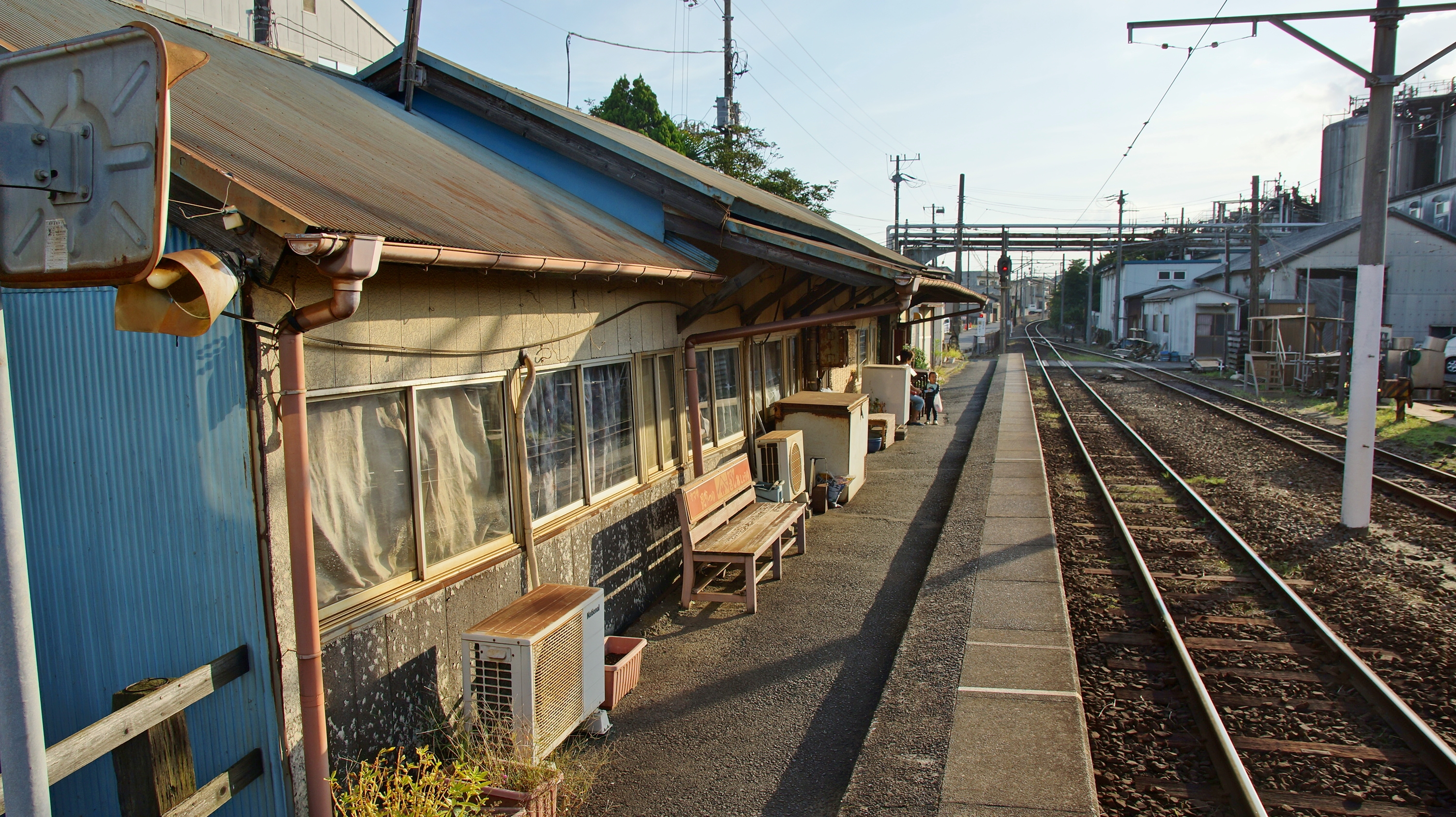
The station platform, looking east, in October 2015

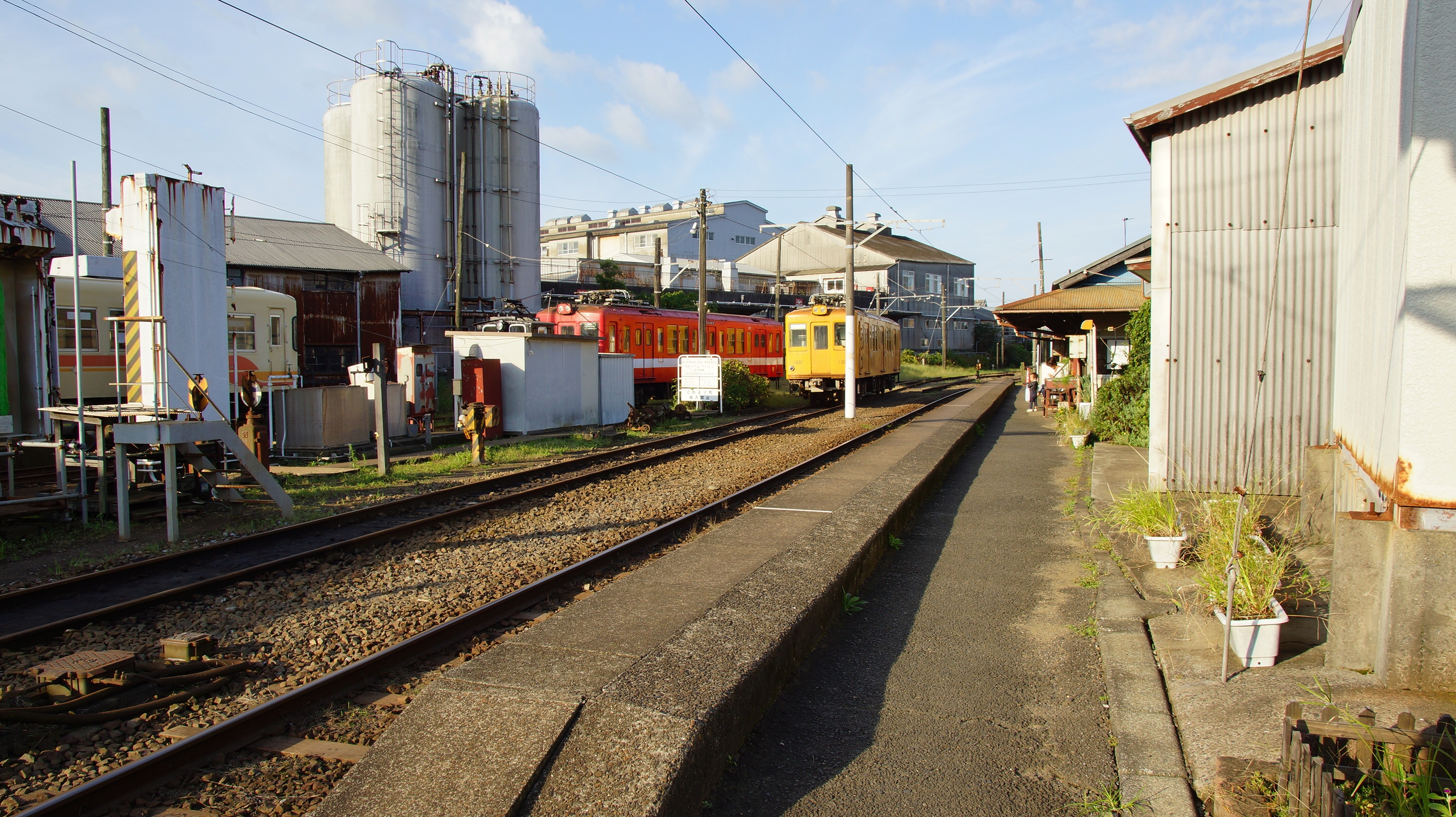
The station platform, looking west, with Nakanocho Depot on the left, in October 2015

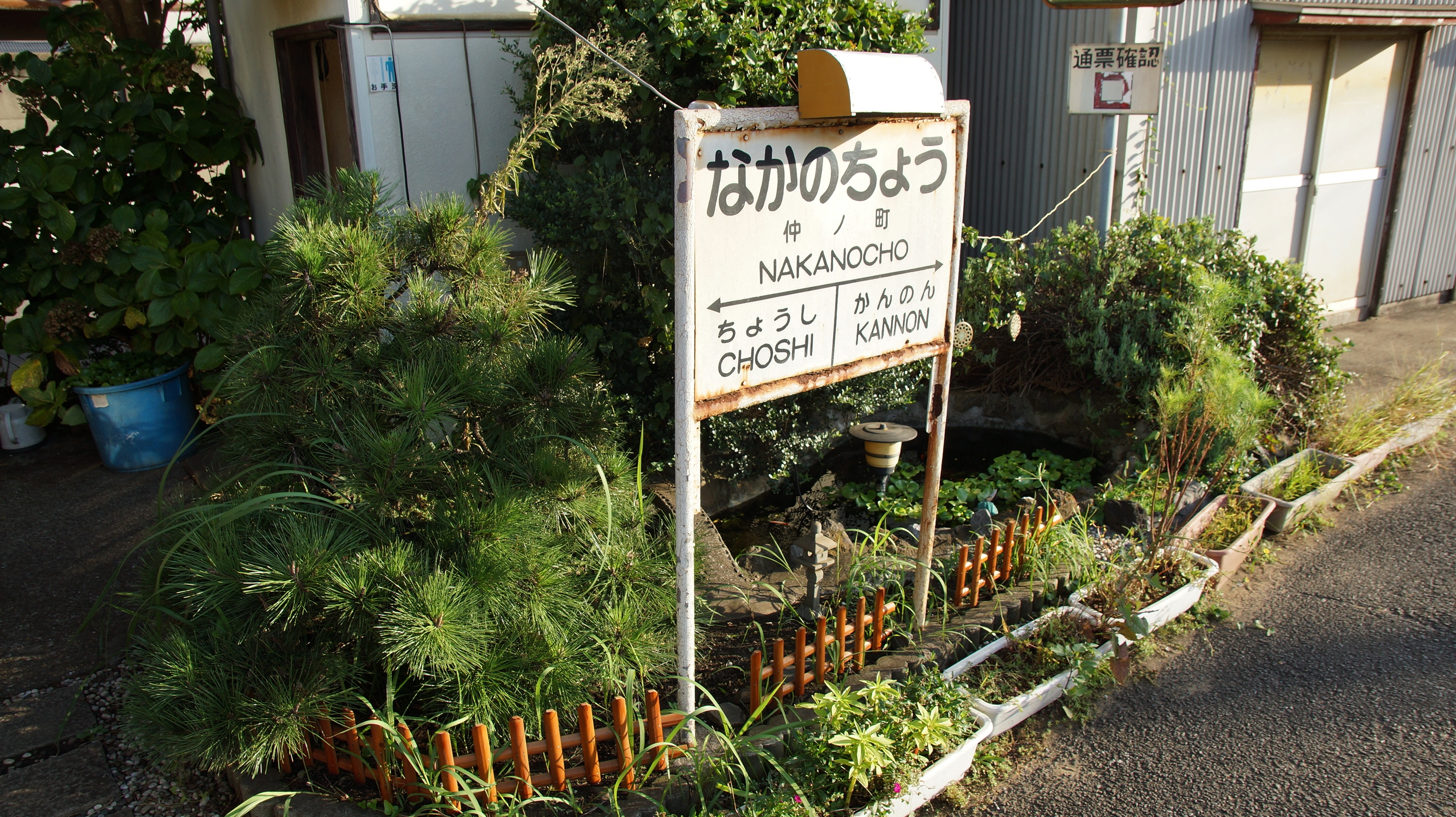
The station sign in October 2015

== History ==
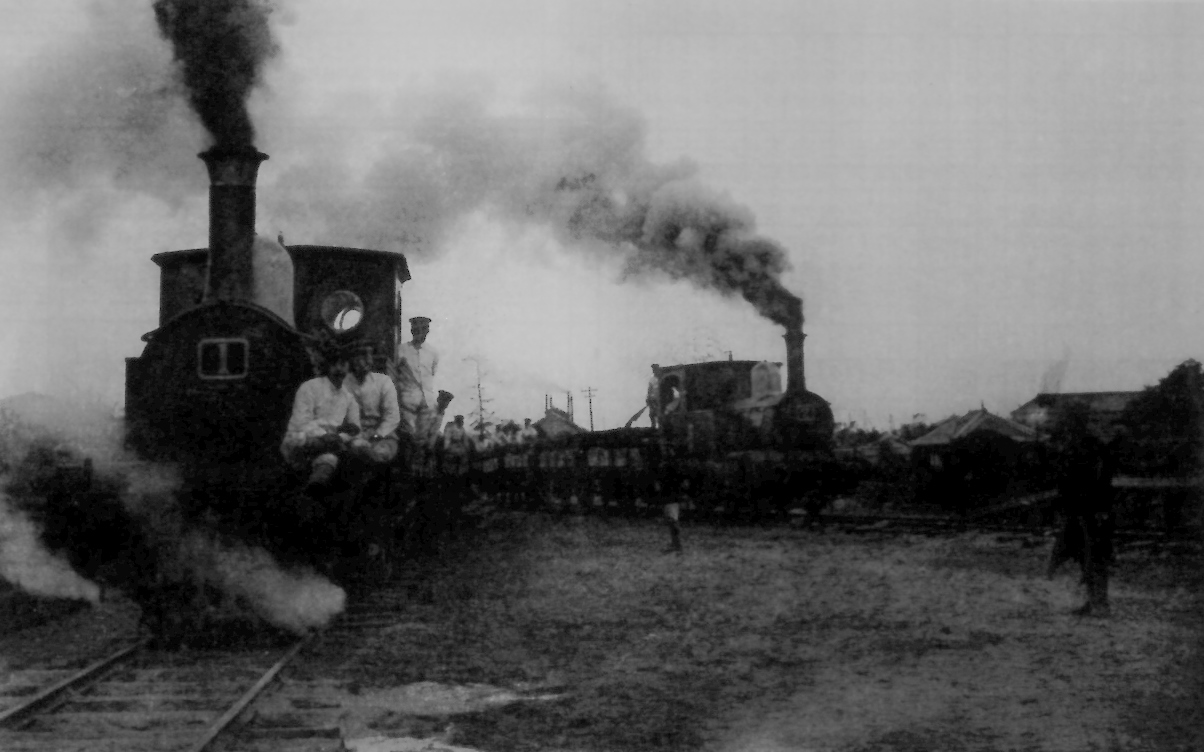
Steam locomotive numbers 1 and 2 next to Nakanochō Station on the Chōshi Sightseeing Railway circa 1913

Nakanochō Station first opened in December 1913 as a station on the Chōshi Sightseeing Railway (銚子遊覧鉄道, Chōshi Yūran Tetsudō), which operated a distance of 5.9 km between Chōshi and Inuboh. The railway closed in November 1917, but was reopened on 5 July 1923 as the Chōshi Railway. Nakanochō was the name of the area at the time the station was built.

== Passenger statistics ==
In fiscal 2010, the station was used by an average of 44 passengers daily (boarding passengers only). The passenger figures for past years are as shown below.

Fiscal year	Daily average
2007	51
2008	57
2009	45
2010	44

== Surrounding area ==
- Yamasa head office and soy sauce factory
- Futaba Elementary School

== See also ==
- List of railway stations in Japan
