= Kannon Station =

Railway station in Chōshi, Chiba Prefecture, Japan

Kannon Station 観音駅
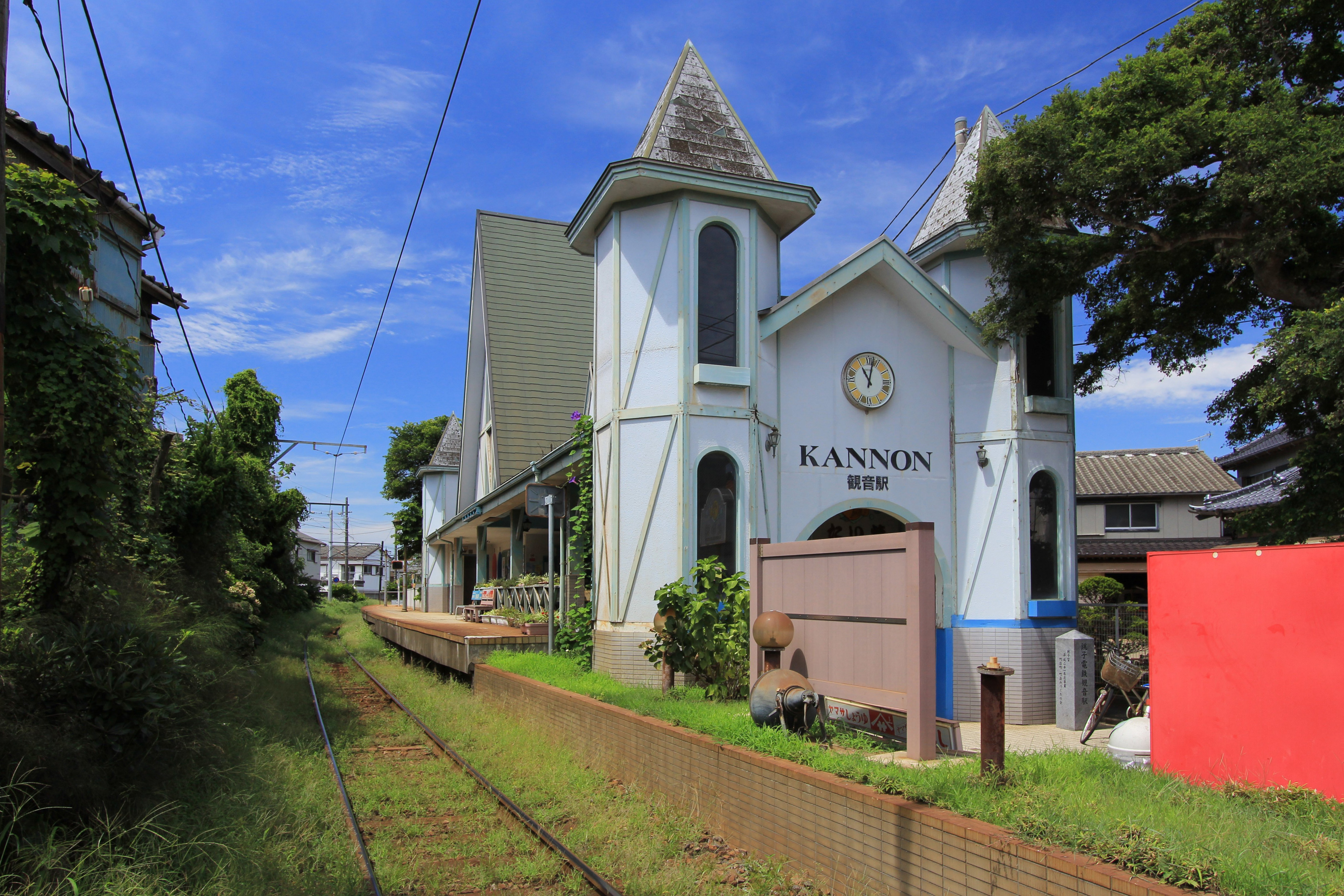
- Kannon Station in August 2012

General information
- Location: 36–1 Maejuku-chō, Chōshi-shi, Chiba-ken 288–0031; Japan
- Coordinates: 35°43′44″N 140°50′24″E
- Operator: Chōshi Electric Railway
- Line: Chōshi Electric Railway Line
- Distance: 1.1 km from Chōshi
- Platforms: 1 (1 side platform)
- Tracks: 1

Construction
- Parking: No
- Accessible: Yes

Other information
- Station code: CD03

History
- Opened: December 1913
- Rebuilt: 1925, 1991
- Electrified: 1 July 1925

Passengers
- FY2010: 108 daily

Services
| Preceding station | Choshi Electric Railway | Following station |
|---|---|---|
| Nakanochō towards Chōshi | Chōshi Electric Railway Line | Moto-Chōshi towards Tokawa |
Location
- Location within Chiba Prefecture Location within Japan

Kannon Station (観音駅, Kannon-eki) is a railway station on the privately operated Chōshi Electric Railway Line in Chōshi, Chiba, Japan.

== Lines ==
Kannon Station is served by the 6.4 km Chōshi Electric Railway Line from Chōshi to Tokawa. It is between Nakanochō and Moto-Chōshi stations and is one kilometer from Chōshi Station.

== Station layout ==
The station consists of one side platform serving a single track. The station building was rebuilt in December 1991 to resemble a Swiss mountain railway station. The station is staffed, and, until March 2017, included a shop that baked taiyaki cakes.

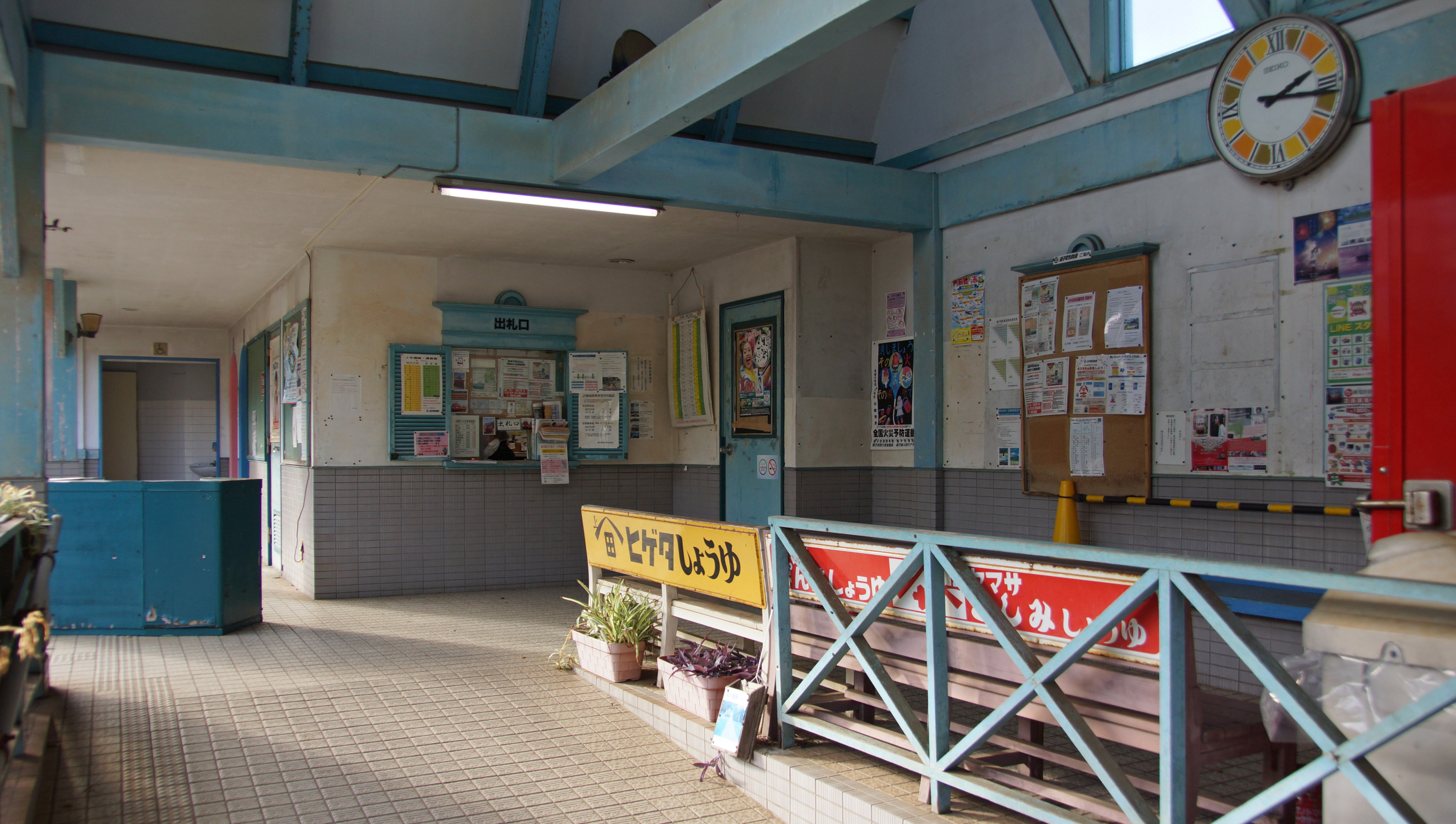
The ticket office and waiting area in November 2017

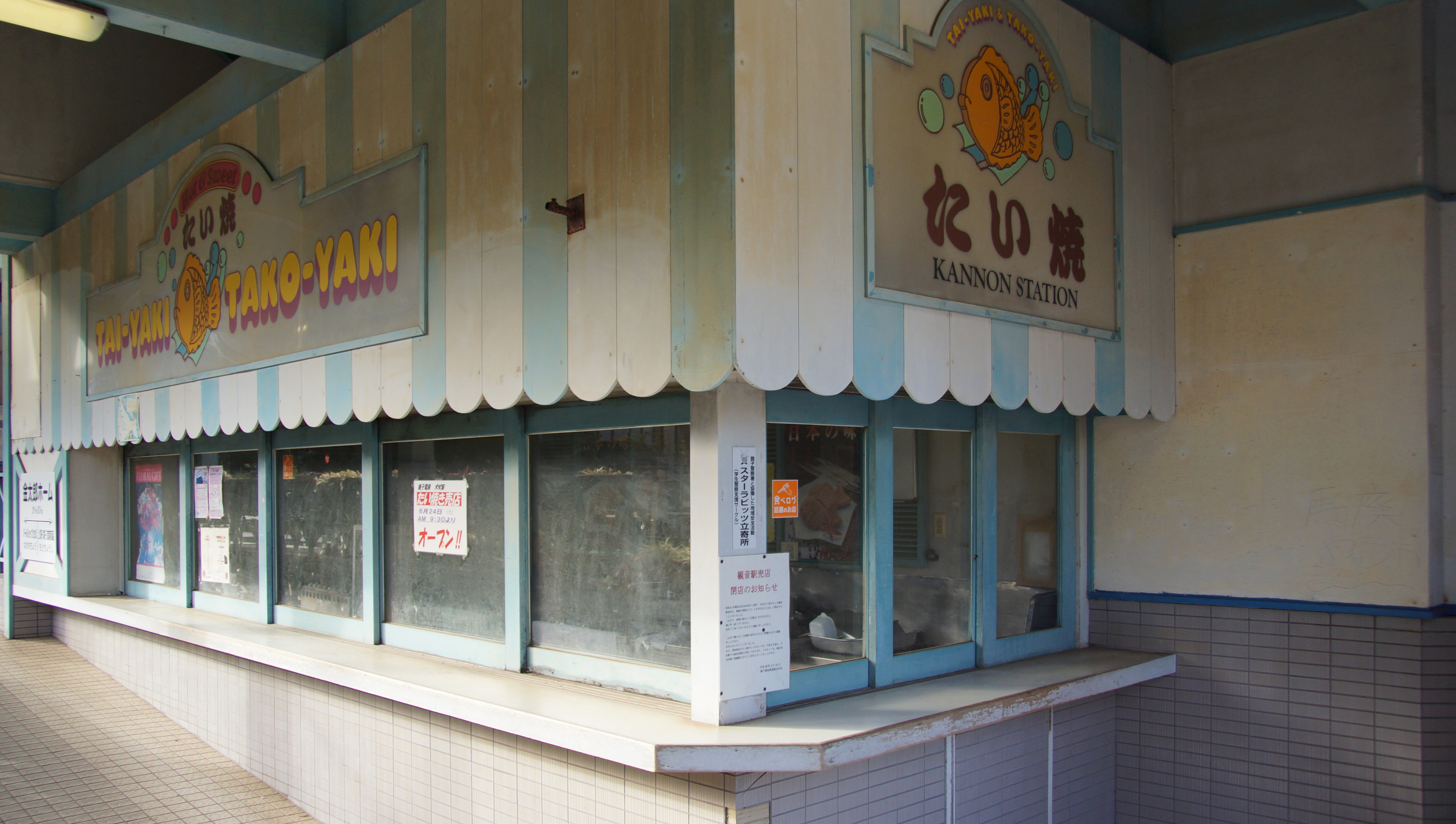
The former taiyaki cake shop in November 2017

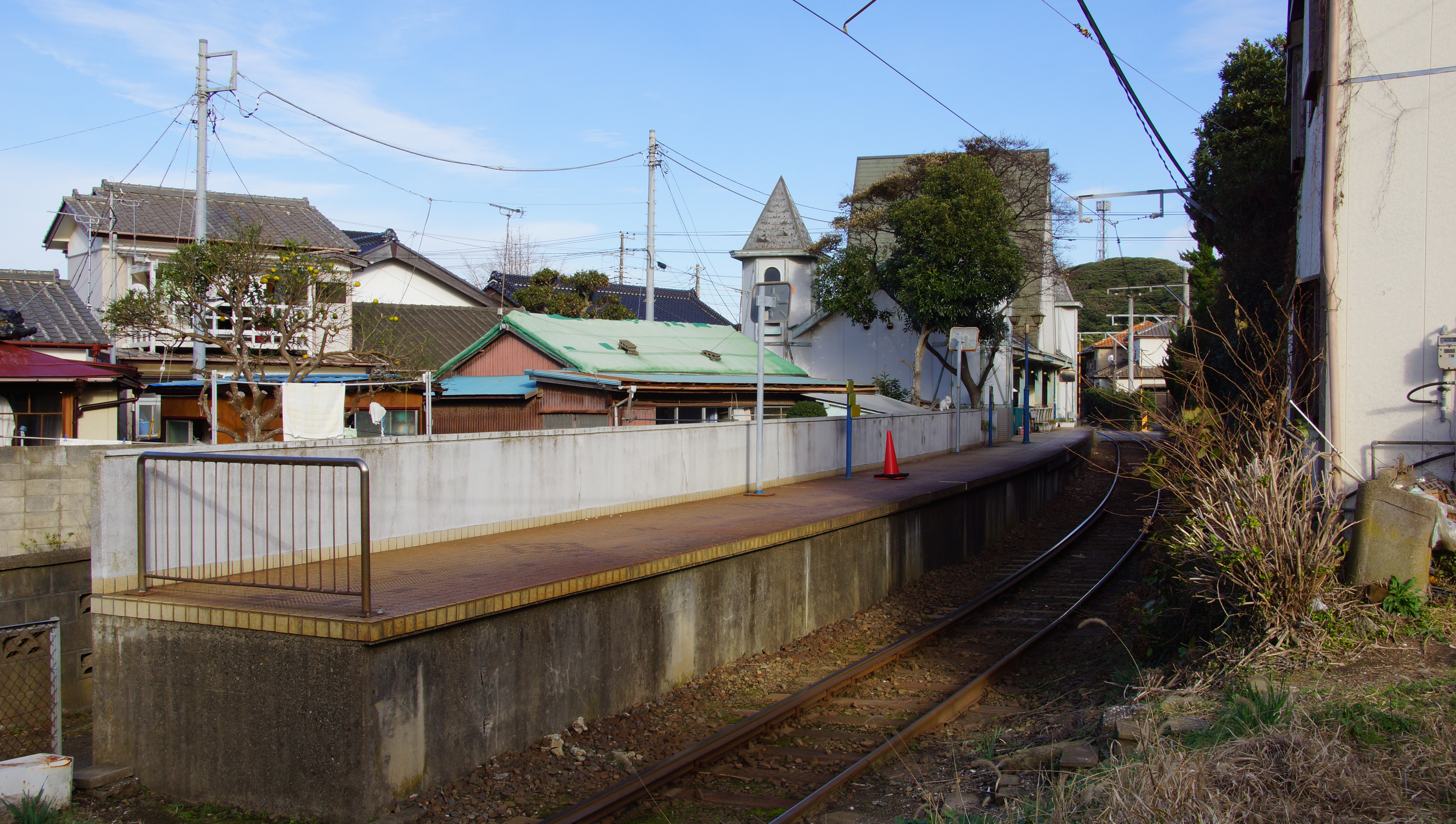
The station platform in November 2017

== History ==
Kannon Station first opened in December 1913 as a station on the Chōshi Sightseeing Railway (銚子遊覧鉄道, Chōshi Yūran Tetsudō), which operated a distance of 5.9 km between Chōshi and Inuboh. The railway closed in November 1917, but was reopened on 5 July 1923 as the Chōshi Railway. In 1925, the station was moved to its current location, further away from Nakanochō Station.

The taiyaki cake shop inside the station was scheduled to close at the end of March 2017, over 40 years after it opened in 1976.

== Passenger statistics ==
In fiscal 2010, the station was used by an average of 108 passengers daily (boarding passengers only). The passenger figures for past years are as shown below.

| Fiscal year | Daily average |
|---|---|
| 2007 | 152 |
| 2008 | 171 |
| 2009 | 127 |
| 2010 | 108 |

== Surrounding area ==
- Enpuku-ji temple
- Chōshi Municipal Sports Centre
- Chiba Prefectural Choshi High School

== See also ==
- List of railway stations in Japan
