= Moto-Chōshi Station =

Railway station in Chōshi, Chiba Prefecture, Japan

Moto-Chōshi Station 本銚子駅
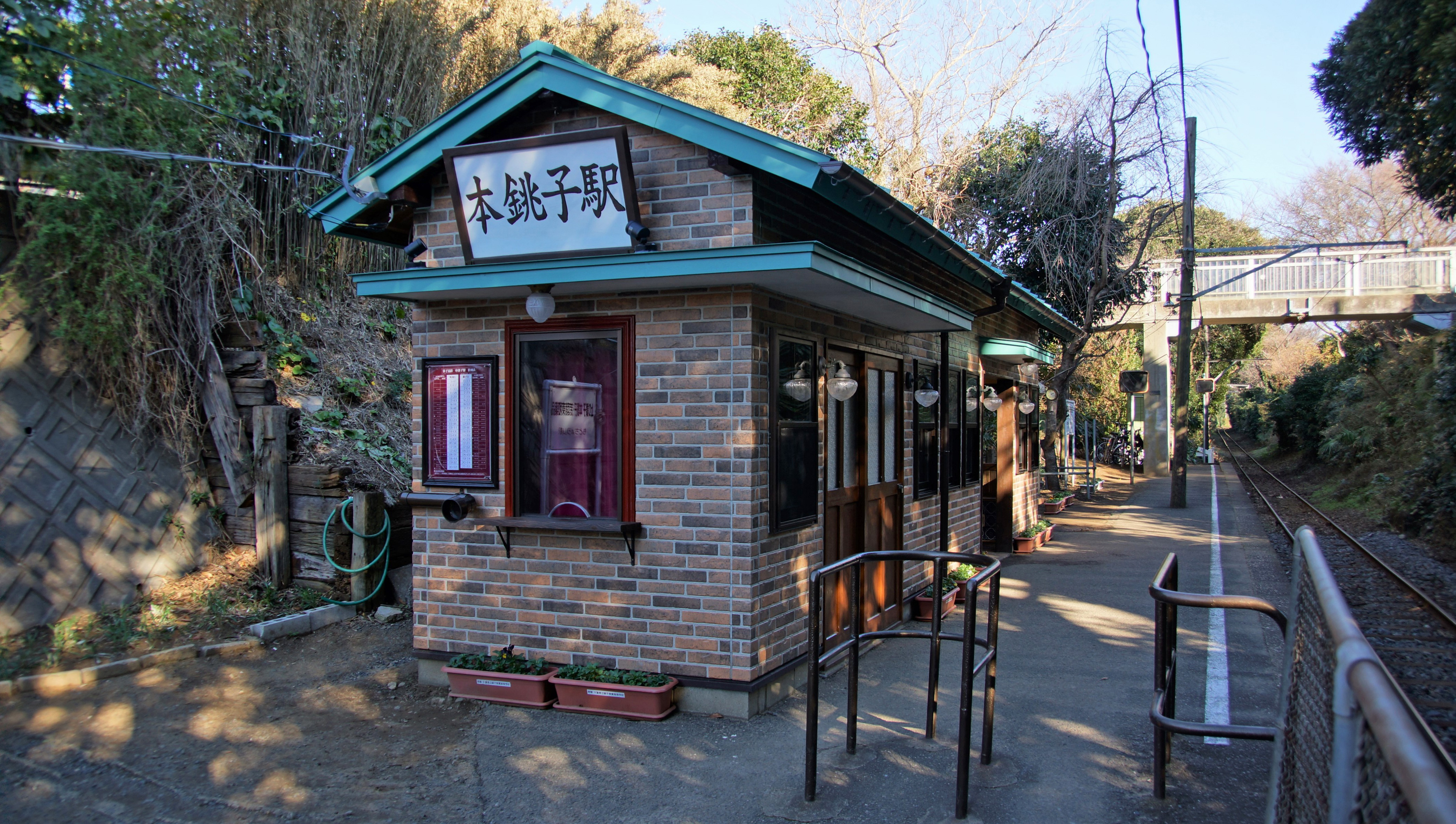
- Moto-Chōshi Station exterior in November 2017

General information
- Location: 2917 Shimizu-chō, Chōshi-shi, Chiba-ken; Japan
- Coordinates: 35°43′52″N 140°50′52″E
- Operator: Choshi Electric Railway
- Line: Choshi Electric Railway Line
- Distance: 1.8 km from Chōshi
- Platforms: 1 (1 side platform)
- Tracks: 1

Construction
- Parking: No

Other information
- Status: Unstaffed
- Station code: CD04

History
- Opened: December 1913
- Rebuilt: August 2017
- Electrified: 1 July 1925

Passengers
- FY2015: 86 daily

Services
Preceding station	Choshi Electric Railway	Following station
Kannon towards Chōshi	Chōshi Electric Railway Line	Kasagami-Kurohae towards Tokawa
Location
- Location within Chiba Prefecture Location within Japan

Moto-Chōshi Station (本銚子駅, Moto-Chōshi-eki) is a railway station on the privately operated Choshi Electric Railway Line in Chōshi, Chiba, Japan.

== Lines ==
Moto-Chōshi Station is served by the 6.4 km (4.0 mi) Choshi Electric Railway Line from Chōshi to Tokawa. It is located between Kannon and Kasagami-Kurohae stations, and is a distance of 1.8 km (1.1 mi) from Chōshi Station.

== Station layout ==
The station consists of one side platform serving a single track, and is unstaffed.

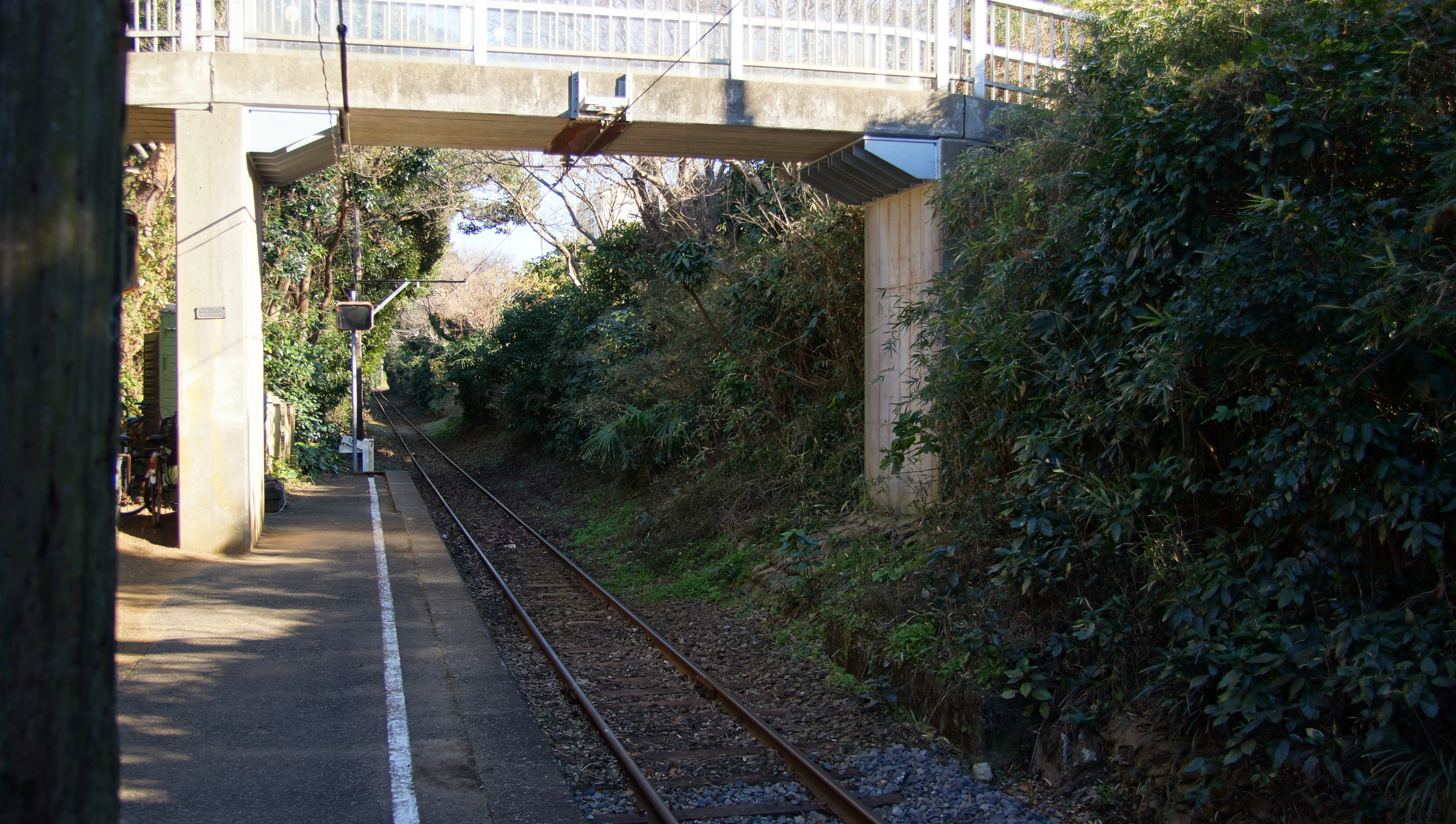
The platform and view looking east in November 2017

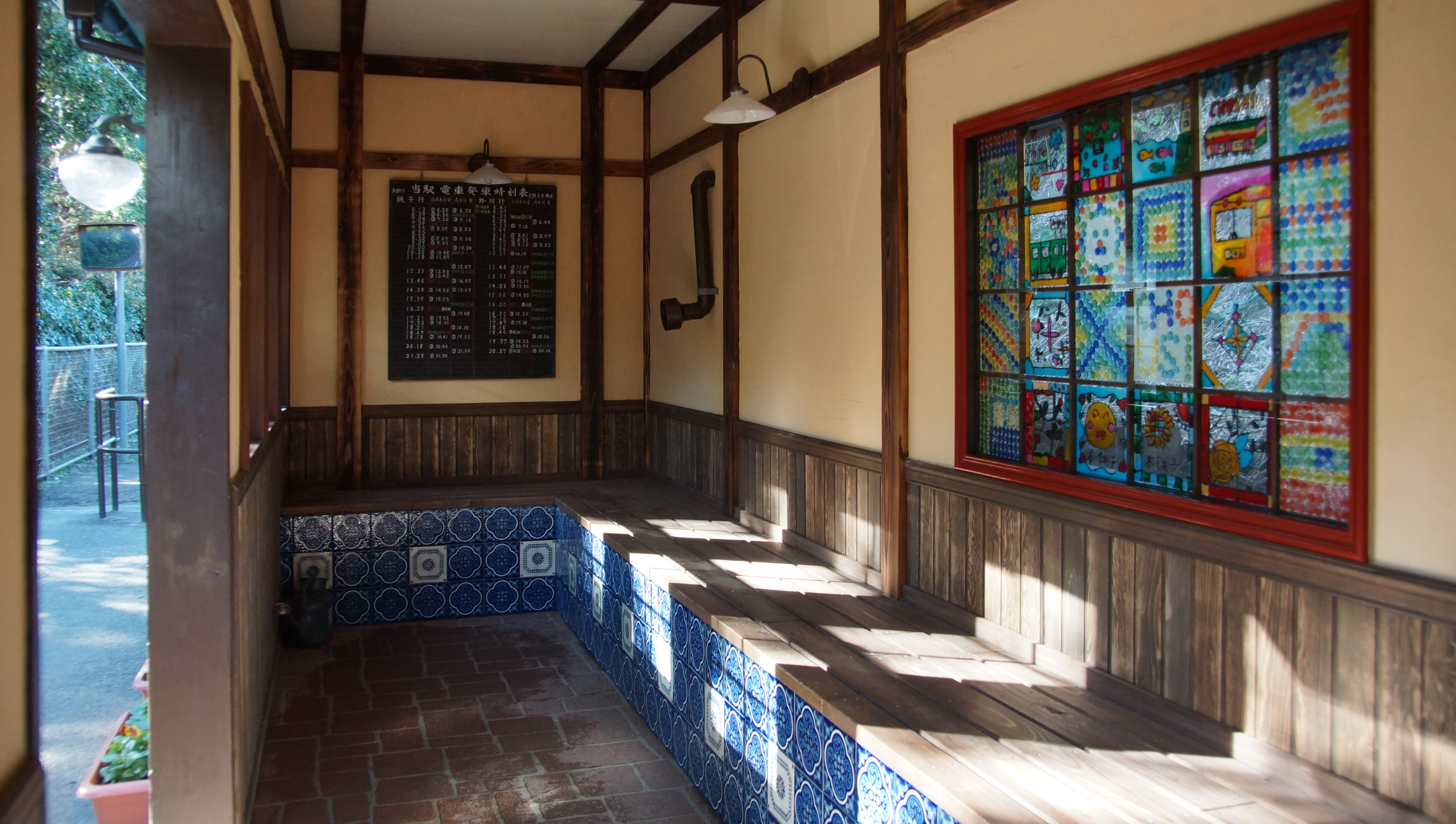
The interior of the waiting room in November 2017

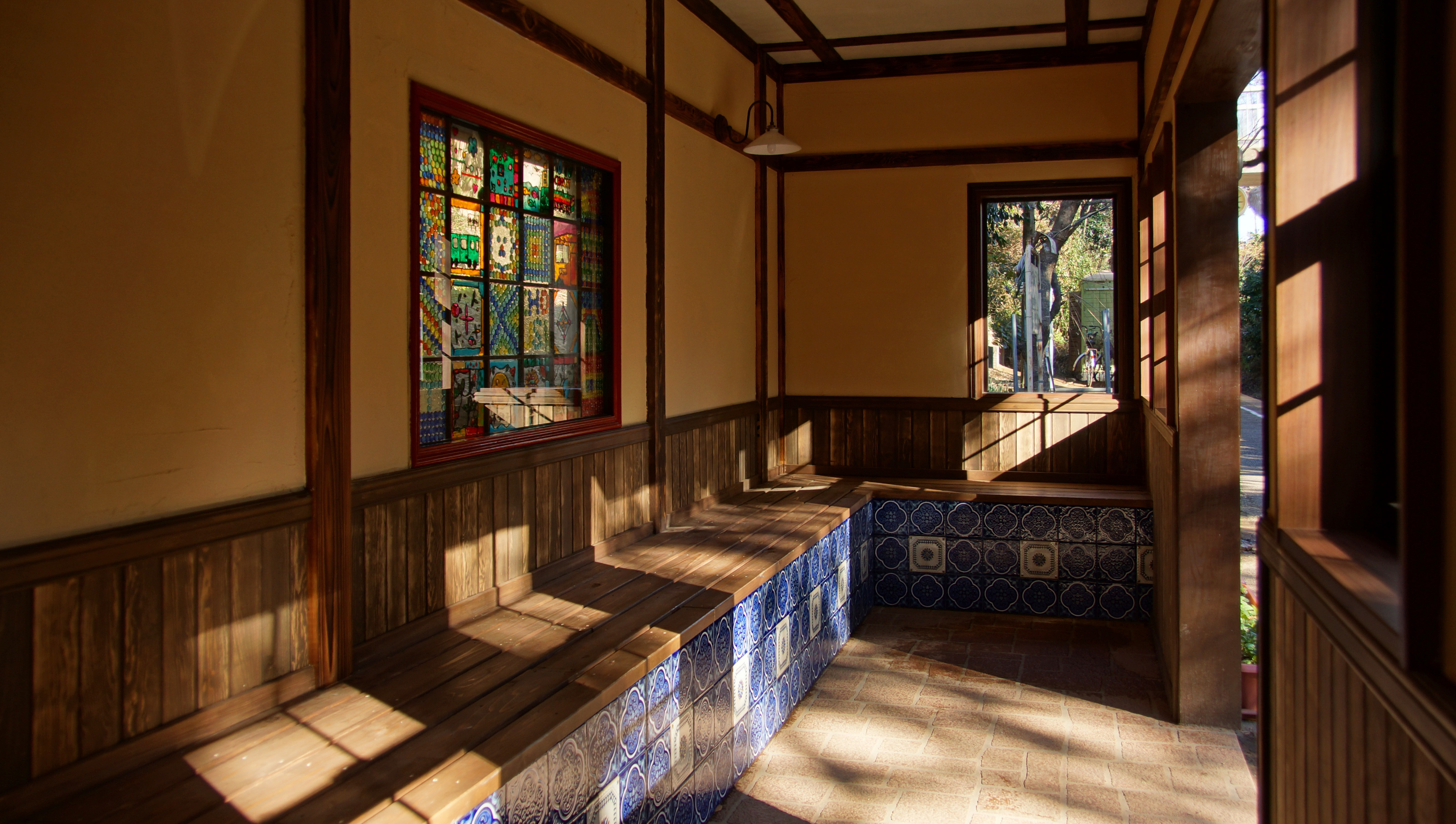
The interior of the waiting room in November 2017

== History ==
Moto-Chōshi Station first opened in December 1913 as a station on the Chōshi Sightseeing Railway (銚子遊覧鉄道, Chōshi Yūran Tetsudō), which operated a distance of 5.9 km between Chōshi and Inuboh. The railway closed in November 1917, but was reopened on 5 July 1923 as the Chōshi Railway. Motochōshi was the name of the area at the time the station was built.

The station was used in the filming of the 1985 NHK TV drama Miotsukushi.

The station became unstaffed from 1 January 2008.

The station was renovated in August 2017 as part of a special Nippon Television 24-hour TV project.

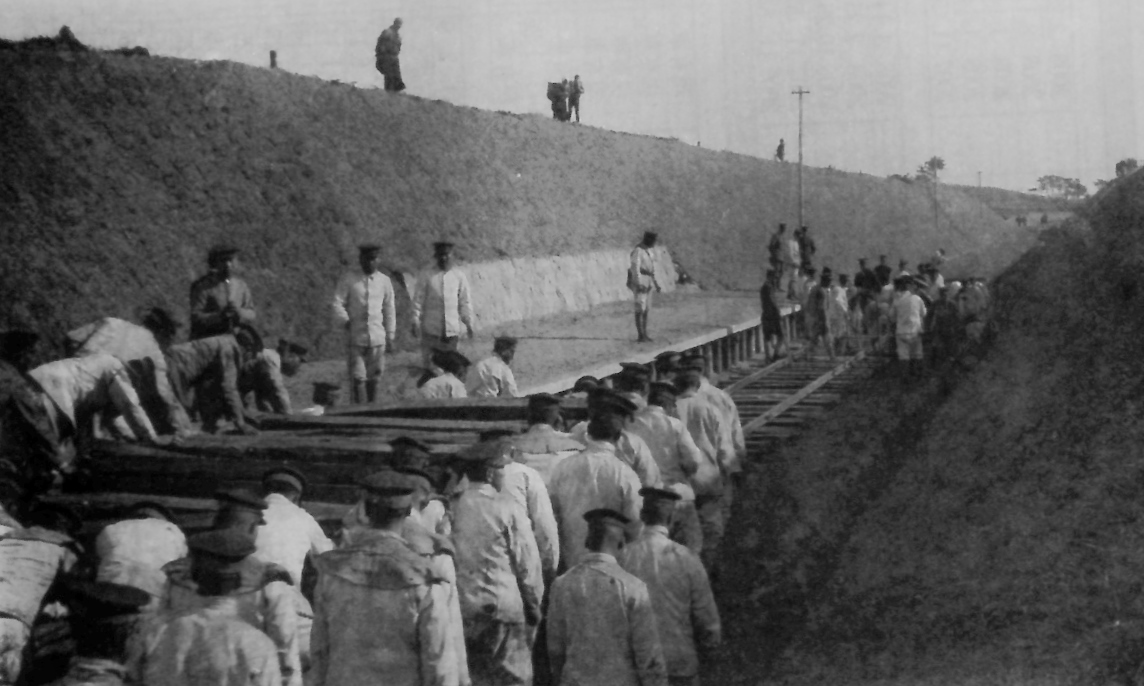
Moto-Choshi Station under construction by army engineers circa 1913

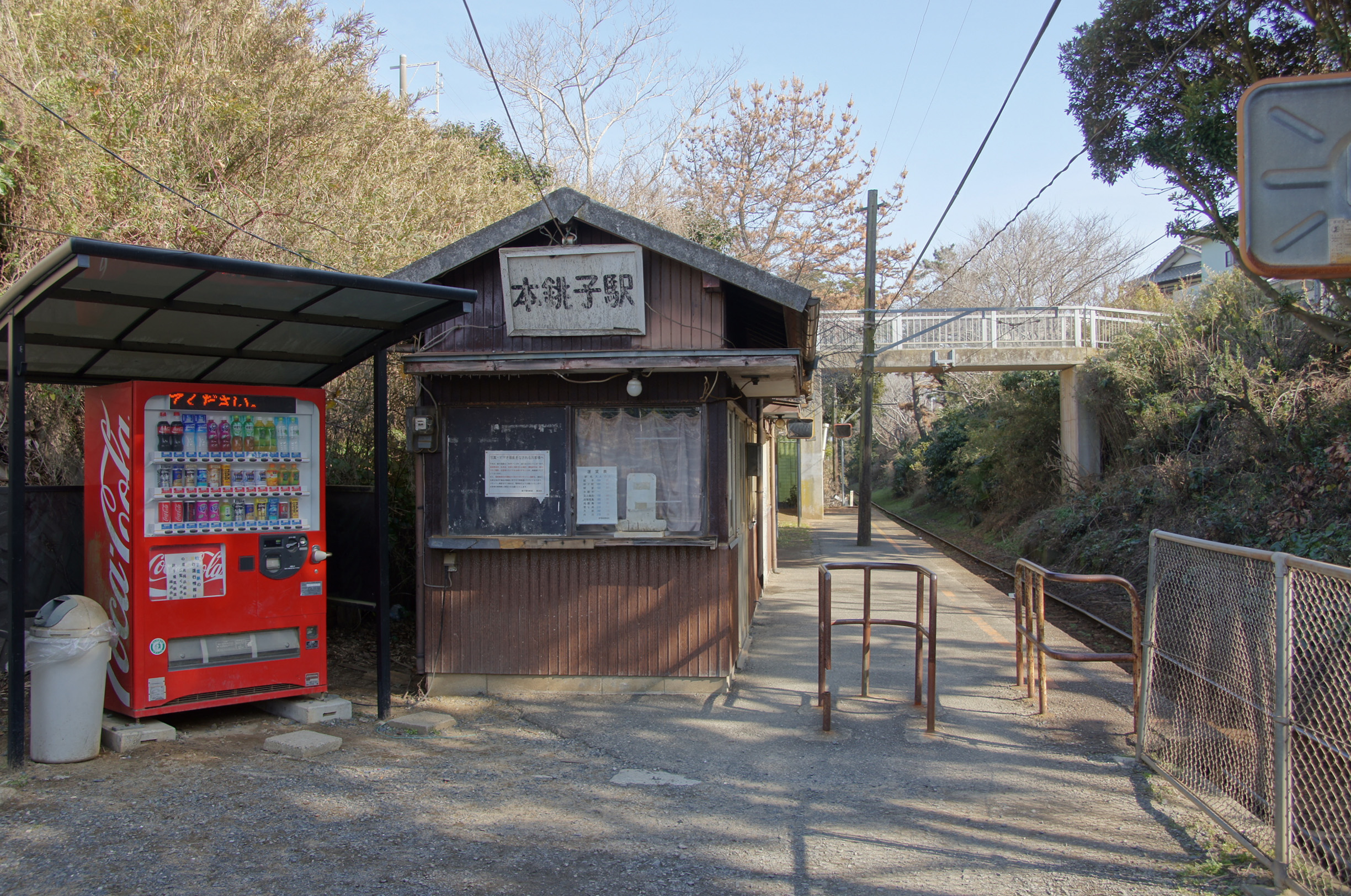
The station in January 2012, before renovation

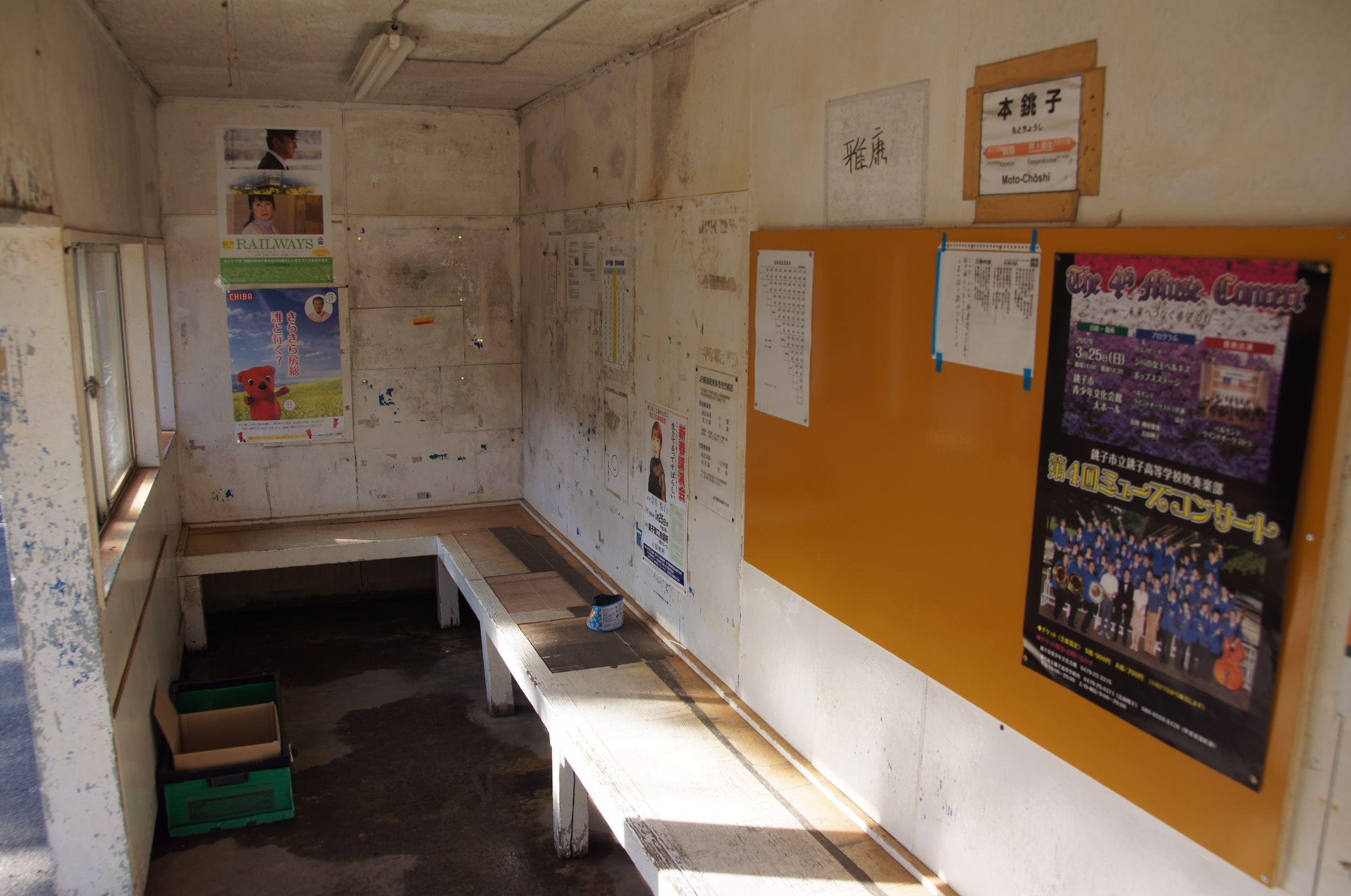
The waiting room in January 2012, before renovation

== Passenger statistics ==
In fiscal 2015, the station was used by an average of 86 passengers daily (boarding passengers only). The passenger figures for past years are as shown below.

Fiscal year	Daily average
2007	189
2008	180
2009	181
2010	156
2015	86

== Surrounding area ==
- Chōshi Shimizu Elementary School
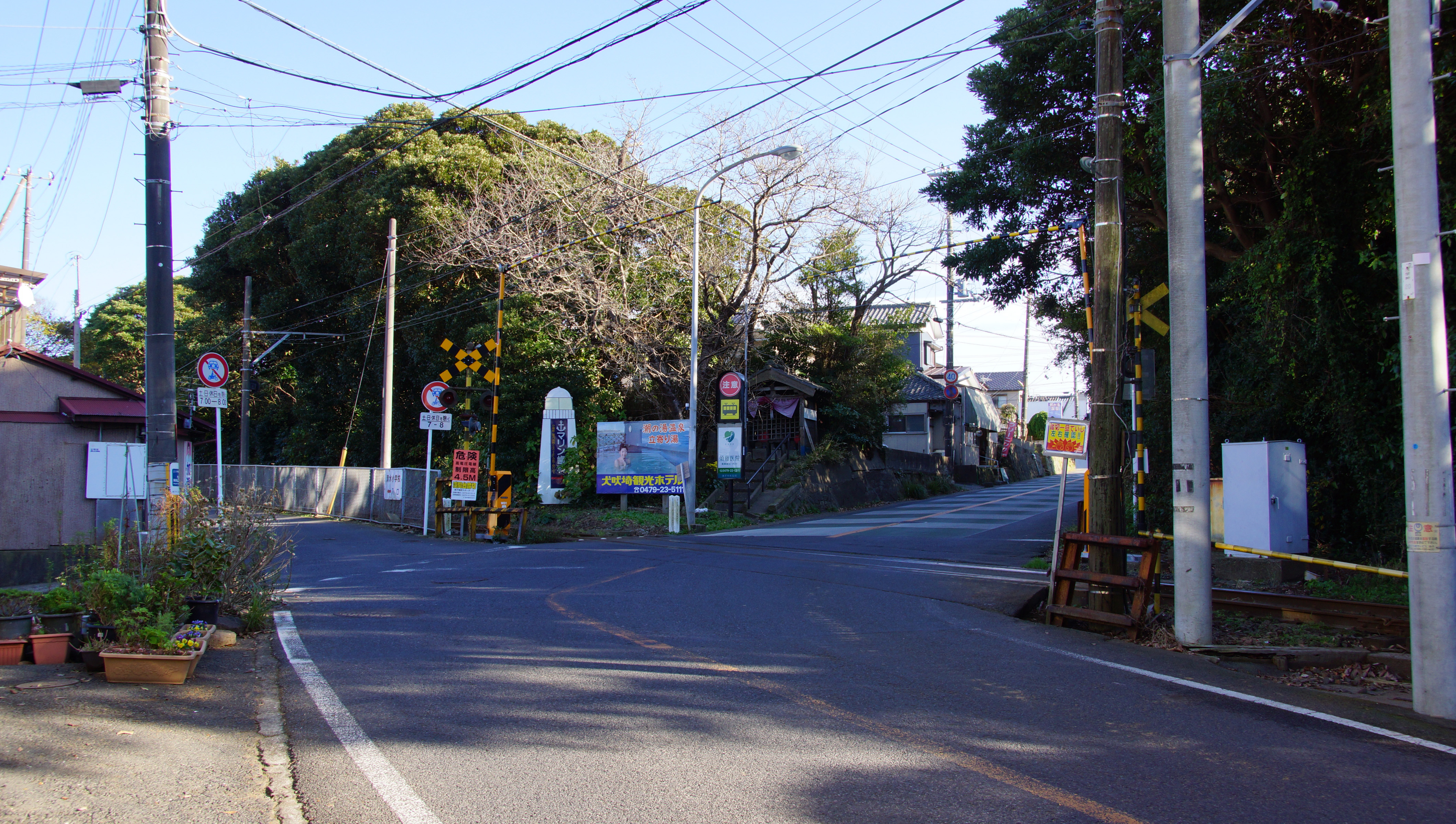
The level crossing for Chiba Prefectural Route 244 to the west of the station in November 2017

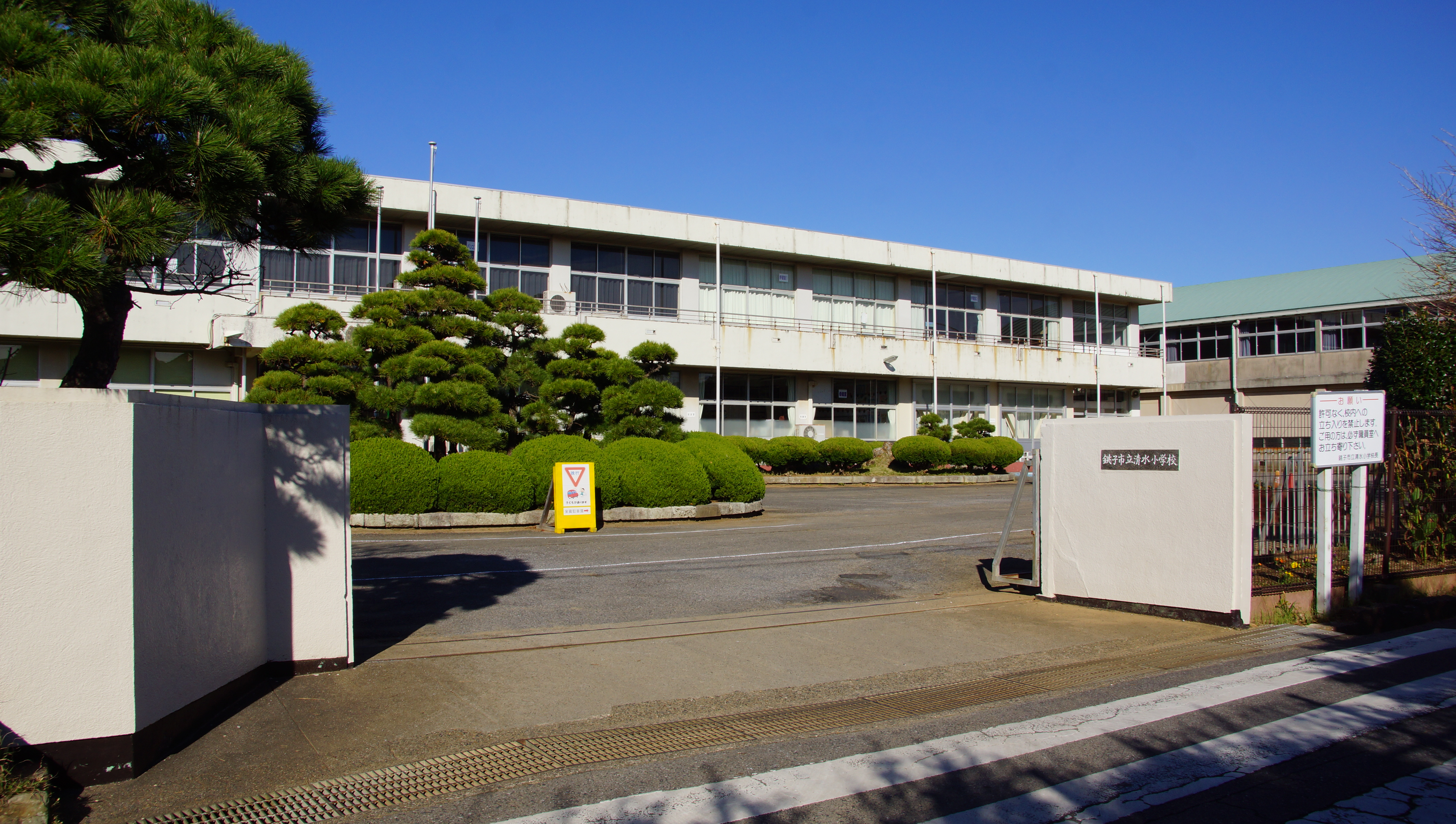
Choshi Shimizu Elementary School entrance in November 2017

== See also ==
- List of railway stations in Japan
