= Choshi Electric Railway 3000 series =

Japanese train type

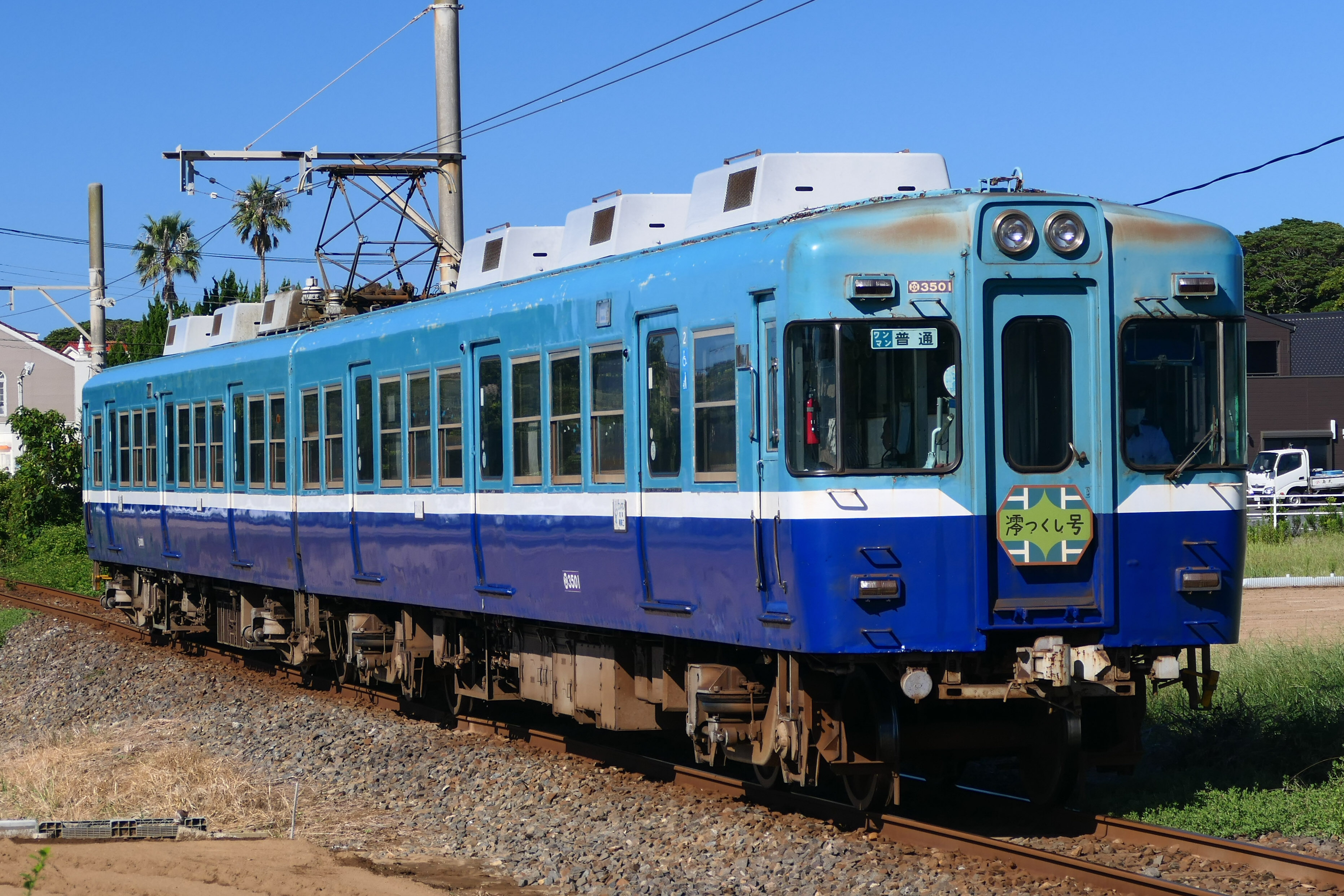
- The 3000 series set in September 2024
- In service: 26 March 2016 –
- Replaced: 1000 series
- Constructed: 1963
- Refurbished: 2015
- Number in service: 2 vehicles (1 set)
- Formation: 2 cars per trainset
- Fleet numbers: 3001
- Capacity: 130
- Operator: Choshi Electric Railway
- Depot: Nakanochō

Specifications
- Car body construction: Steel
- Car length: 18 m (59 ft 1 in)
- Doors: 3 sliding doors per side
- Electric system: 600 V DC
- Current collection: Overhead wire
- Track gauge: 1,067 mm (3 ft 6 in)

The Choshi Electric Railway 3000 series (銚子電鉄3000形, Chōshi Dentetsu 3000-gata) is an electric multiple unit (EMU) train type operated by the private railway operator Choshi Electric Railway in Chiba Prefecture, Japan, since March 2016. The sole two-car set was converted from former Iyotetsu 700 series EMU cars, which were themselves converted from former Keio 5000 series EMU cars, and was introduced to replace the Choshi Electric Railway's 1000 series EMU car number 1001, which was withdrawn in February 2016.

== Formation ==
The two-car set is formed as shown below, with one motored ("DeHa") car and one non-powered trailer ("KuHa") car, and the DeHa 3000 car at the Choshi (i.e. northern) end.

Designation	Mc	Tc
Numbering	DeHa 3001	KuHa 3501

== External livery ==
Following conversion, the train was repainted into a livery consisting of light blue upper body and dark blue lower body separated by a thin white stripe. This livery was based on that applied to the line's former Yu 101 open-sided special-event car nicknamed Miotsukushi.

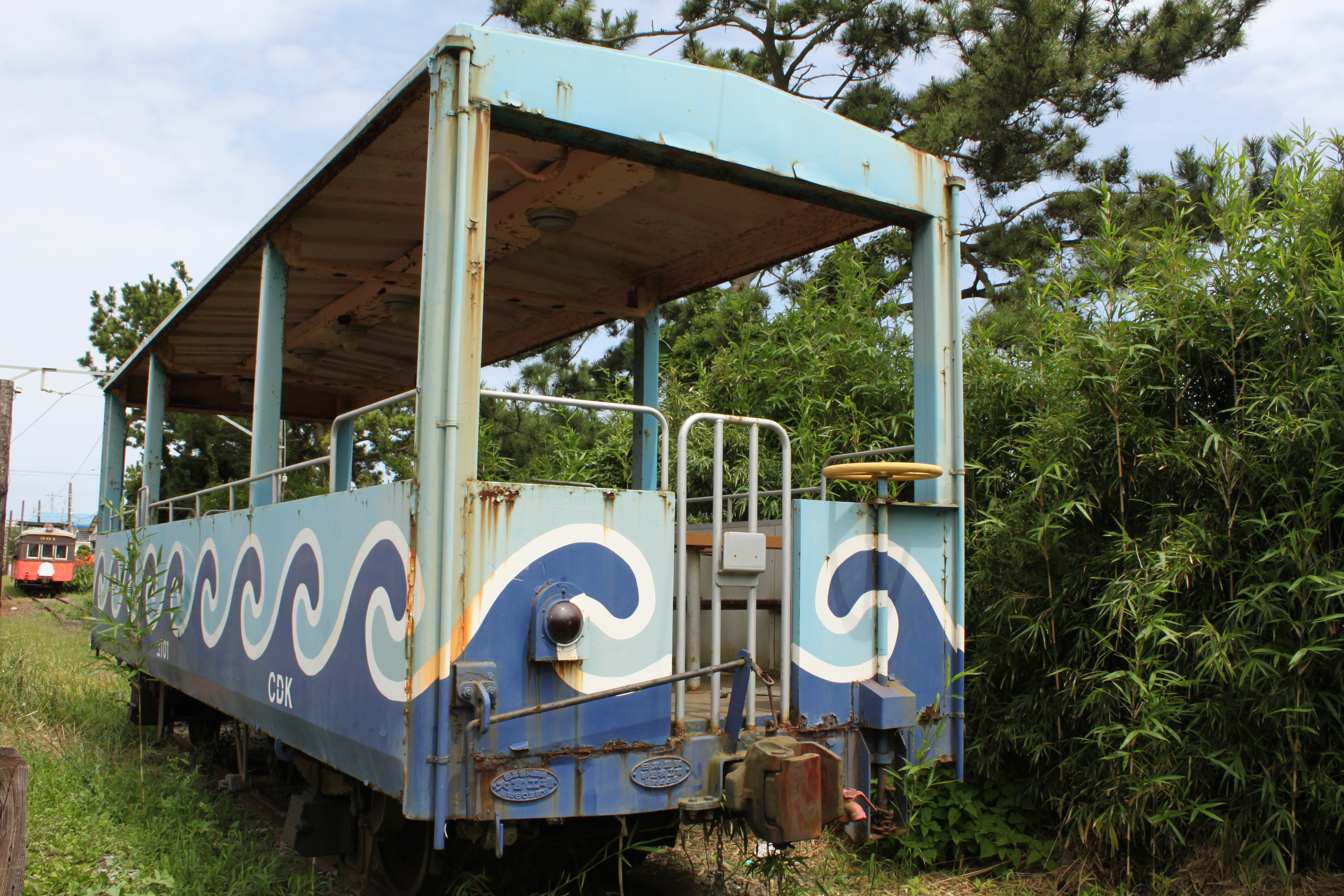
The former Yu 101 open-sided special event car in August 2009

== History ==
The two cars were built in 1963 for Keio Corporation in Tokyo, and resold to the Iyo Railway in Ehime Prefecture in 1988. They were withdrawn from service by the Iyo Railway in June 2015.

The two cars (713 and 763) were purchased from the Iyo Railway at a cost of 1.3 million yen, and shipped to Choshi, arriving at Choshi Port on 15 September 2015. Shipping and conversion work cost an estimated 75 million yen, funded partially by grants from the national government, Chiba Prefecture, and the city of Choshi.

=== Individual car histories ===
Car No.	Keio numbering	Iyo numbering
DeHa 3001	DeHa 5103	MoHa 713
KuHa 3501	KuHa 5854	KuHa 763

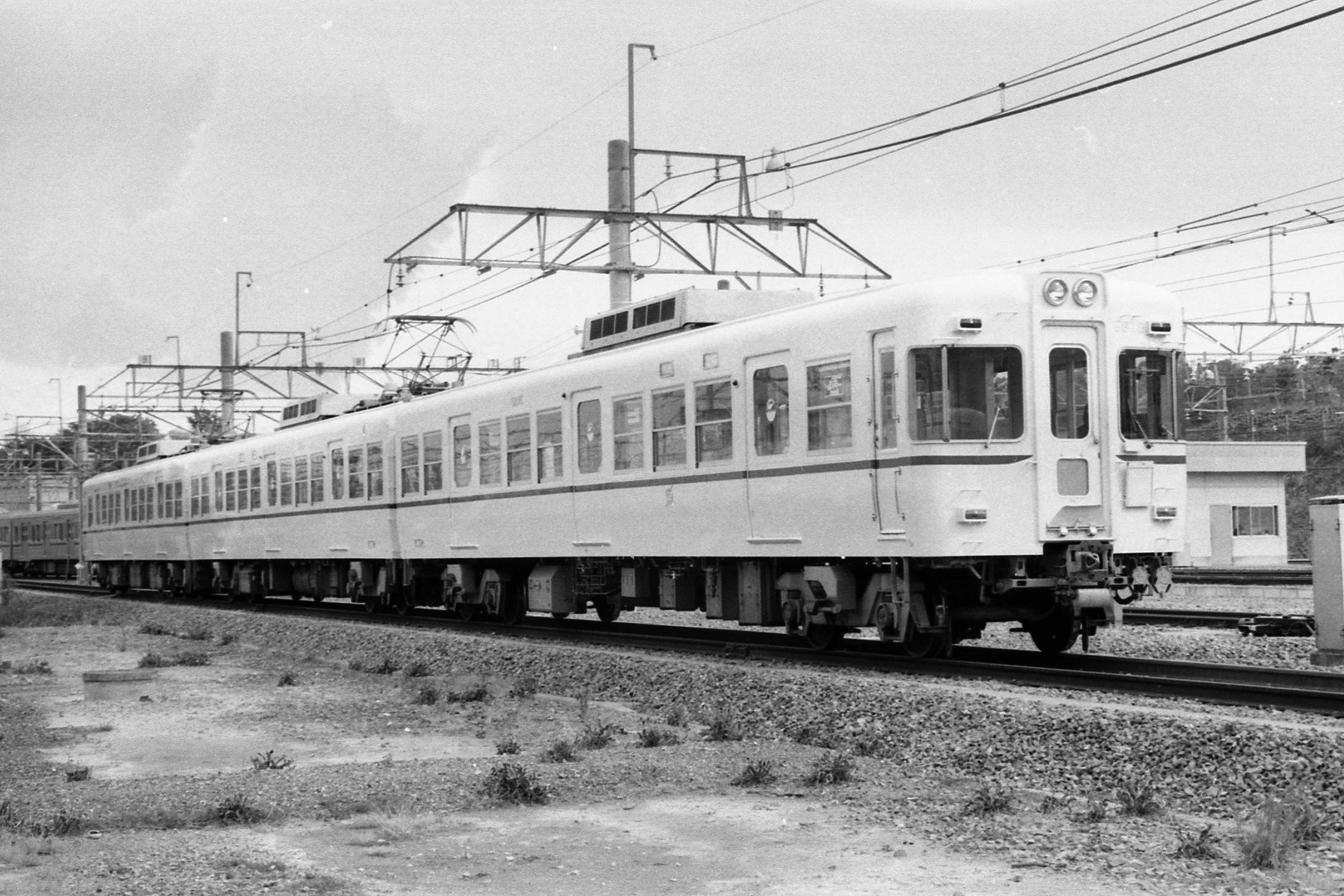
A Keio 5000 series EMU in 1988

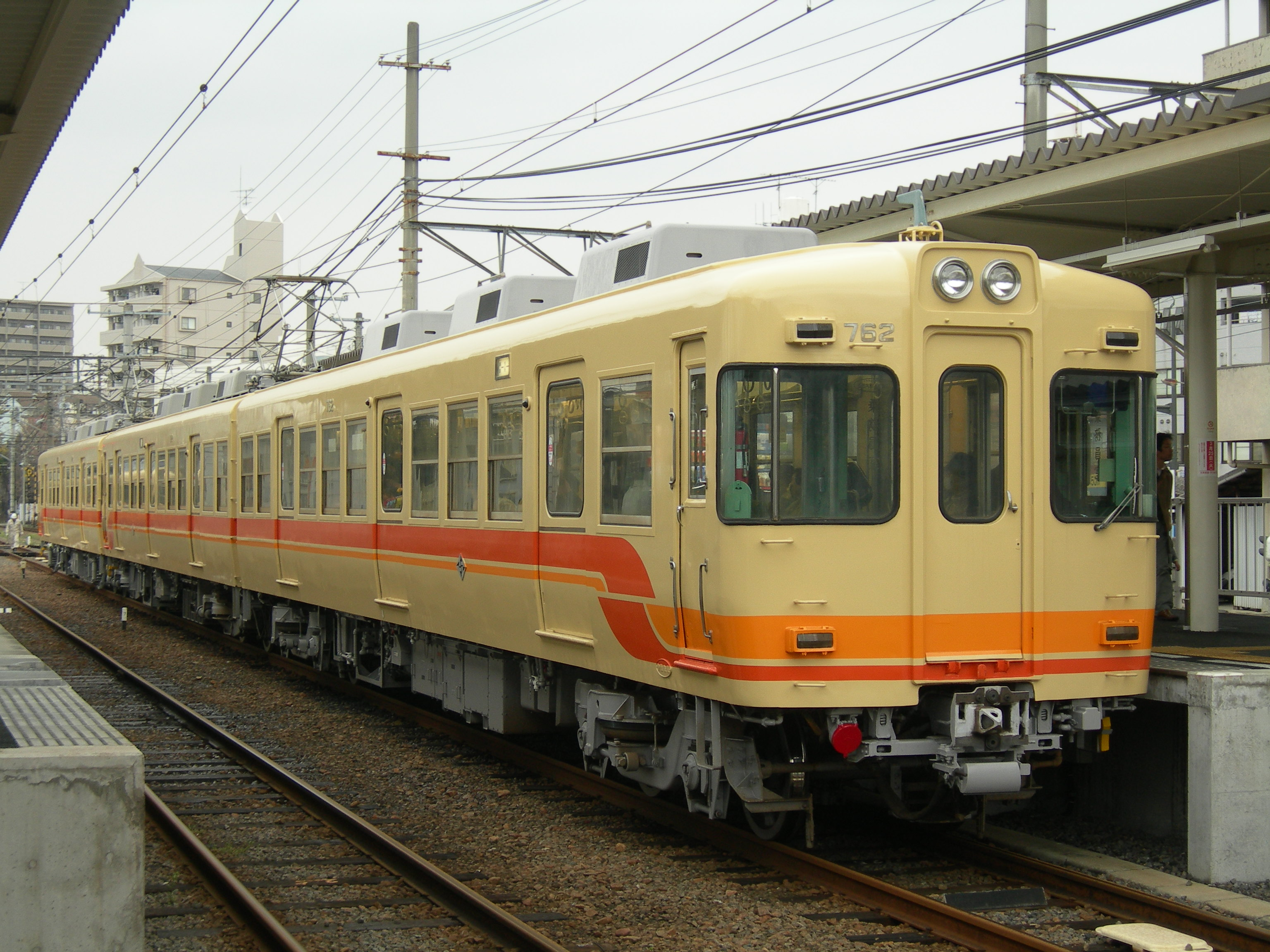
An Iyo Railway 700 series 3-car set in March 2008

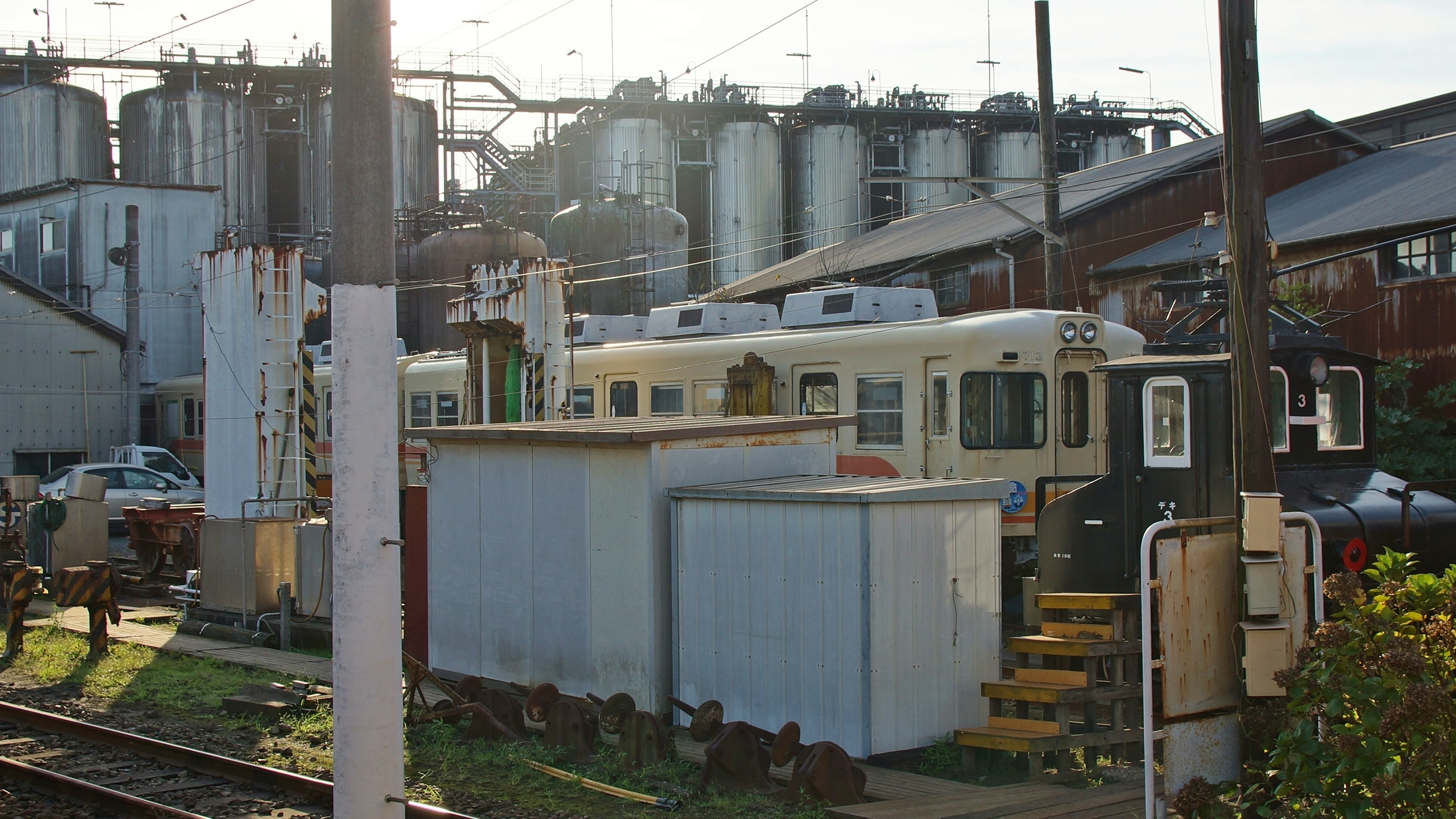
Former Iyo Railway 700 series EMU cars MoHa 713 and KuHa 763 undergoing conversion/repainting work at Nakanocho Depot in October 2015

The train entered service on 26 March 2016.
