= Choshi Electric Railway 1000 series =

Class of 2 Japanese electric railcars

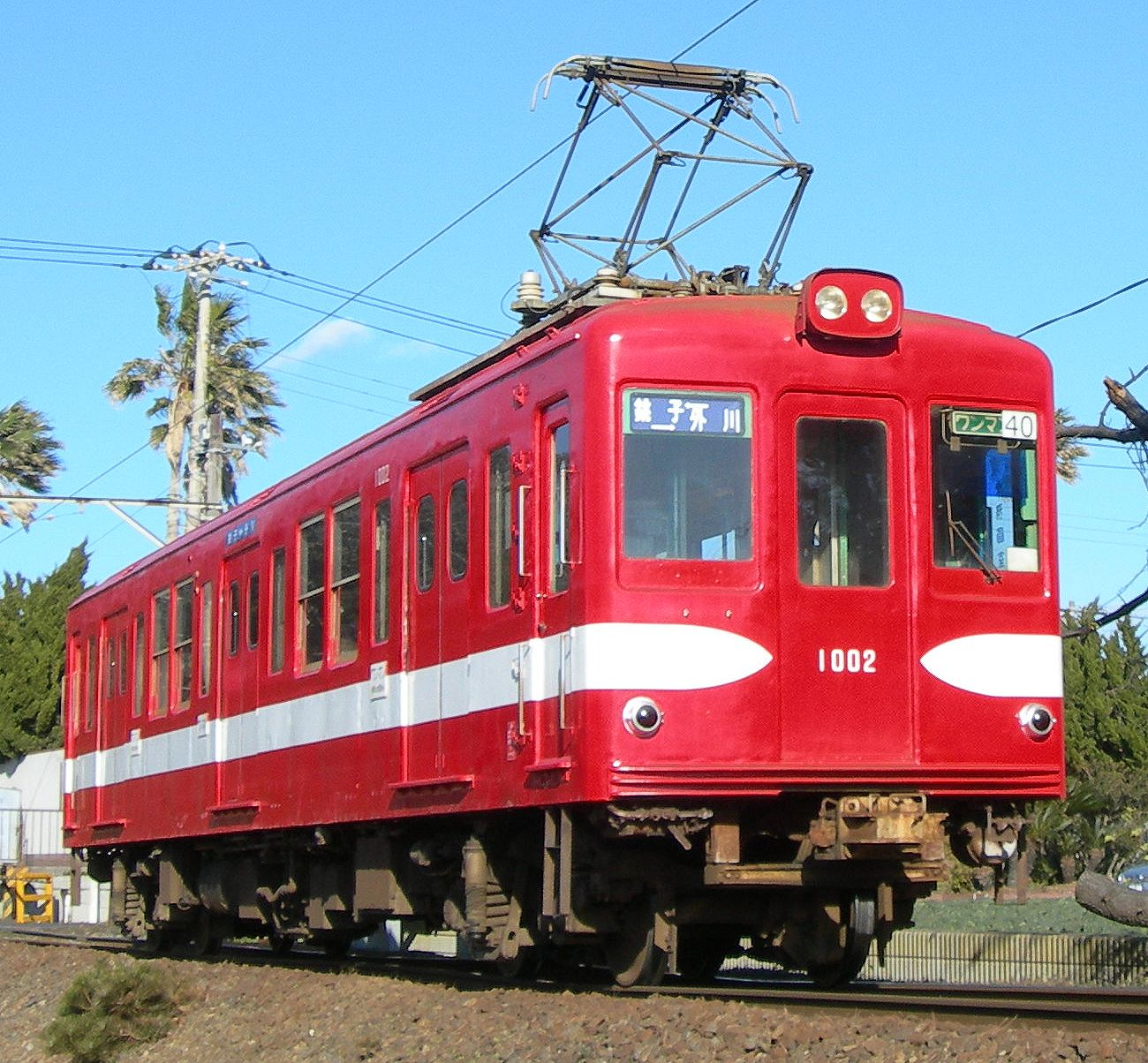
- DeHa 1002 in service in January 2012
- In service: August 1994 – February 2016
- Manufacturer: Hitachi, Teikoku Sharyo
- Replaced: 100/500 series
- Constructed: 1959–1960
- Refurbished: 1994
- Number built: 2 vehicles
- Number in service: None
- Number preserved: 1 vehicle
- Formation: Single car
- Fleet numbers: DeHa 1001/1002
- Capacity: 98 (34 seated)
- Operators: Choshi Electric Railway
- Depots: Nakanochō

Specifications
- Car body construction: Steel
- Car length: 16,000 mm (52 ft 6 in)
- Width: 2,700 mm (8 ft 10 in)
- Height: 4,100 mm (13 ft 5 in)
- Doors: 3 pairs per side
- Weight: 30.5 t
- Traction system: MB-3054-AE4 (75 kW x4)
- Power output: 300 kW
- Electric system(s): 600 V DC overhead wire
- Current collection: PT44A pantograph (x1)
- Bogies: Sumitomo FS-316
- Track gauge: 1,067 mm (3 ft 6 in)

The Choshi Electric Railway 1000 series (銚子電鉄1000形, Chōshi Dentetsu 1000-gata) is an electric multiple unit (EMU) train type formerly operated by the private railway operator Choshi Electric Railway in Chiba Prefecture, Japan, from 1994 until 2016. The type originally consisted of two single cars, DeHa 1001 and DeHa 1002, converted from former TRTA (now Tokyo Metro) subway 2000 series EMU cars, originally built in 1959 and 1960, and introduced from 29 August 1994 to replace the ageing 100 and 500 series EMU cars. Car 1002 was withdrawn in February 2015, and car 1001 was withdrawn in February 2016.

== Build details ==
DeHa 1001 was built in November 1960 by Teikoku Sharyo as car 2046 for the TRTA Ginza Line subway (present-day Tokyo Metro Ginza Line) in Tokyo. DeHa 1002 was built in November 1959 by Hitachi as car 2040 for the Honancho Branch of the TRTA Marunouchi Line subway (present-day Tokyo Metro Marunouchi Line) in Tokyo.

No.	Former No.	Manufacturer	Build date
DeHa 1001	2046	Teikoku Sharyo	November 1960
DeHa 1002	2040	Hitachi	November 1959

Conversion work for use on the Choshi Electric Railway involved the addition of second driving cabs (reclaimed from TRTA 2033 for 2046, and from 2039 for 2040) by the Keio Group train maintenance and refurbishment company Keio Juuki Seibi (京王重機整備). The original 1,435 mm (4 ft 8 1/2 in) standard gauge bogies were replaced with narrow-gauge (1,067 mm (3 ft 6 in)) Sumitomo FS-316 bogies from withdrawn Fuji Kyuko 5700 series EMU cars 5726 and 5725 (former Odakyu 2200 series 2227 and 2228). Pantographs from former TRTA 3000 series Hibiya Line EMUs were added to the former third-rail current collection cars, and the traction motors were also reclaimed from former 3000 series cars.

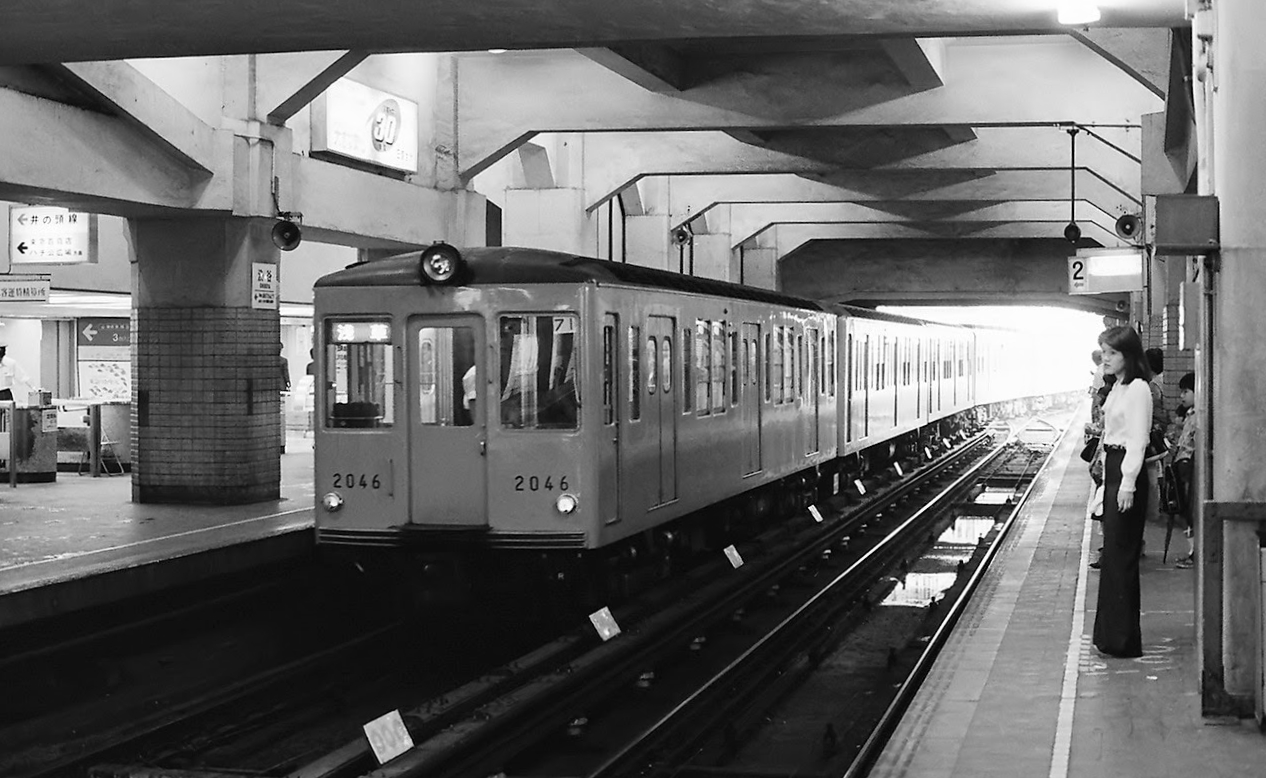
TRTA car 2046 in service on the Ginza Line in 1977

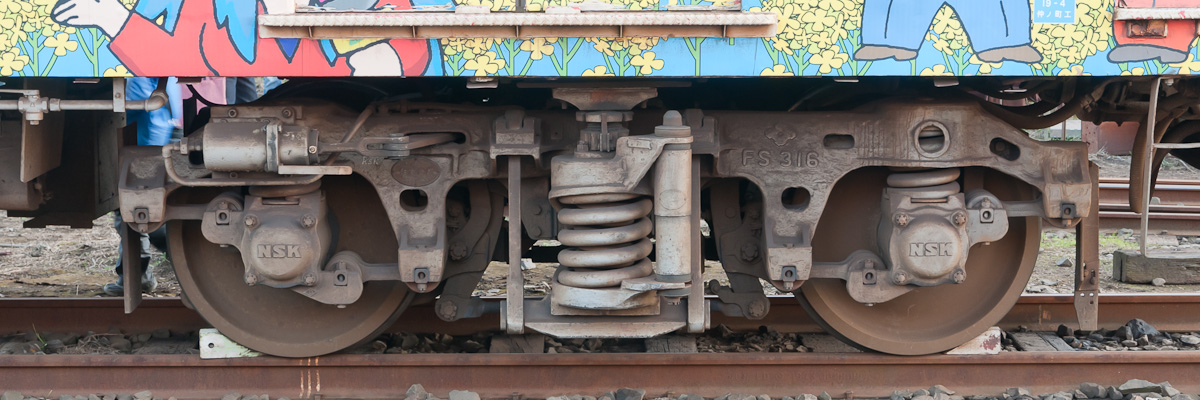
Sumitomo FS-316 bogie on DeHa 1001, January 2010

== External livery ==
Both cars were initially painted in the "new" Choshi Electric Railway livery of dark brown and red.

=== DeHa 1001 ===
On 26 April 2007, DeHa 1001 was returned to service repainted into a sky blue promotional livery sponsored by game manufacturer Hudson Soft in connection with the 20th anniversary of the Momotaro Dentetsu game series in 2008. DeHa 1001 made its last run in "Momotaro Dentetsu" livery on 15 May 2012 before undergoing overhaul and repainting. On 11 August 2012, this unit was publicly unveiled in its all-over yellow livery formerly carried when it operated on the TRTA Ginza Line. It was returned to revenue service in this livery on 16 August. From January 2013, the original TRTA numbering (2046) was added to the Choshi-end of the car. In February 2016, car 1001 received a red roof, more closely resembling the livery carried by the Ginza Line TRTA 2000 series trains. The car was finally withdrawn following its last day in service on 28 February 2016. In March 2016, it was transported by road to the Showa no Mori Museum in Matsudo, Chiba.

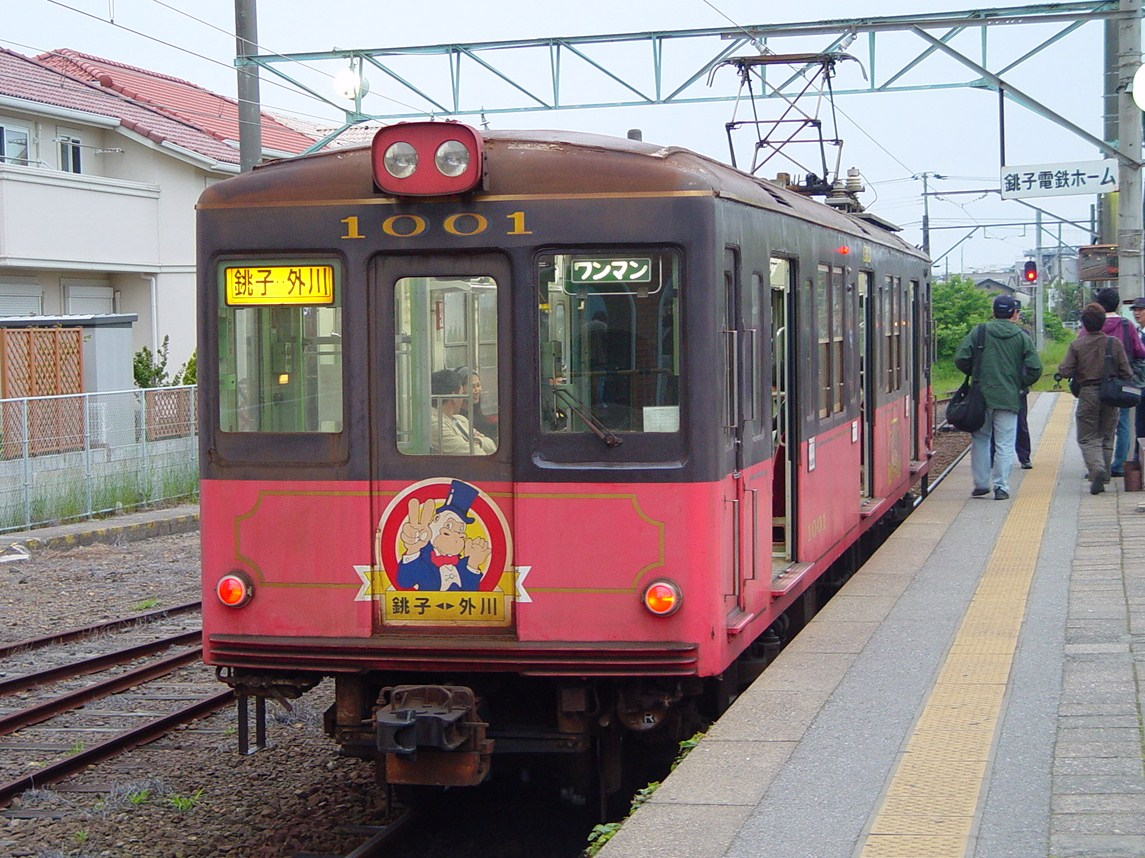
DeHa 1001 in original Choshi Dentetsu livery in May 2006

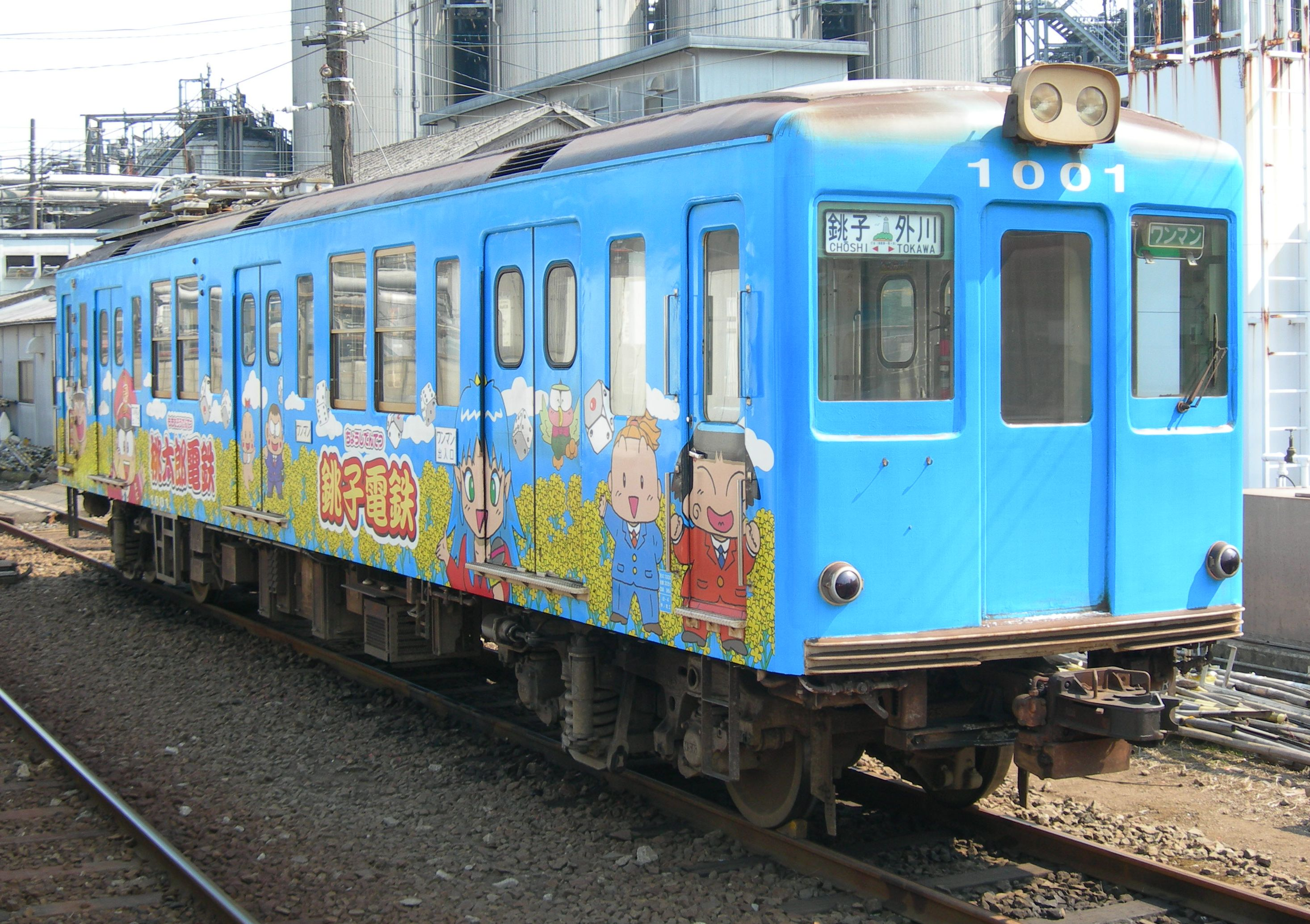
DeHa 1001 in "Momotaro Dentetsu" livery in March 2008

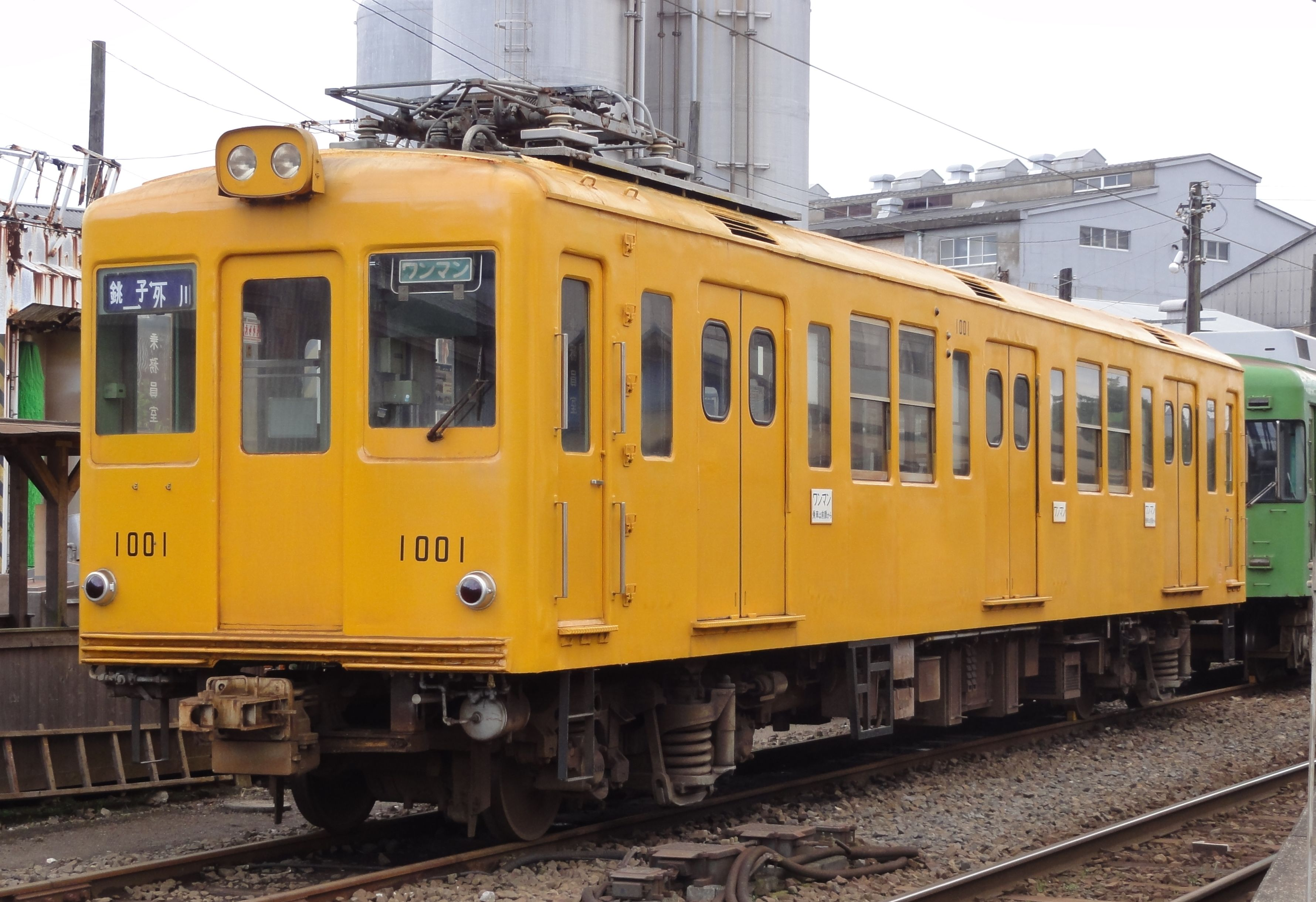
DeHa 1001 in "Ginza Line" livery in December 2012

=== DeHa 1002 ===
DeHa 1002 was repainted into a new orange and blue livery in 2007 designed by Tetsuko no Tabi writer Naoe Kikuchi, intended to evoke an image of the sun rising across the sea. In 2011, DeHa 1002 was repainted into a new livery based on the former TRTA Marunouchi Line colour scheme of red with a white bodyside stripe. The train was returned to revenue service in this livery on 26 November 2011, one day earlier than originally scheduled. From January 2013, the original TRTA numbering (2040) was added to the Choshi end of the car. Unit 1002 was withdrawn from service following its final run on 10 February 2015.

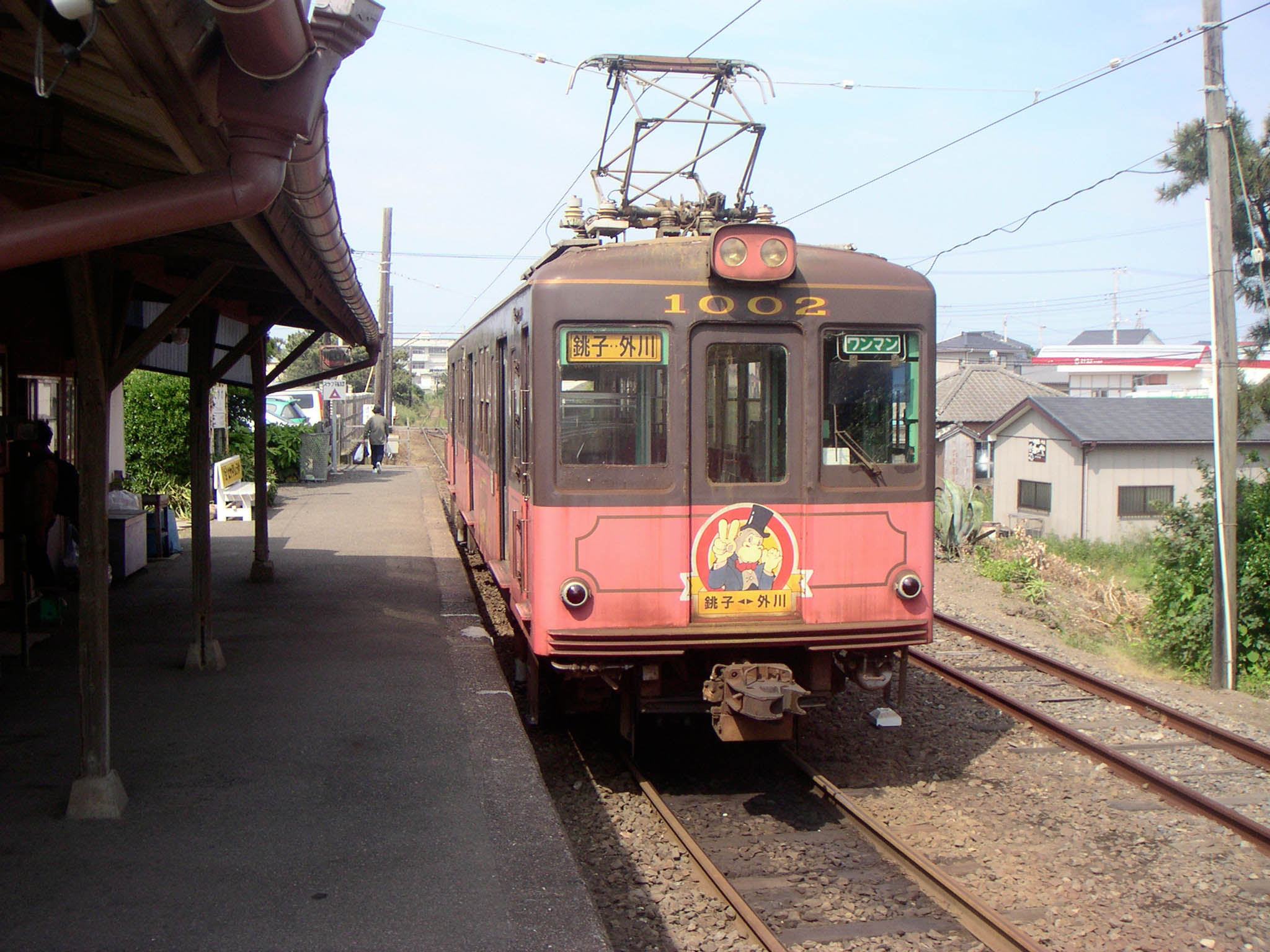
DeHa 1002 in original Choshi Dentetsu livery in May 2005

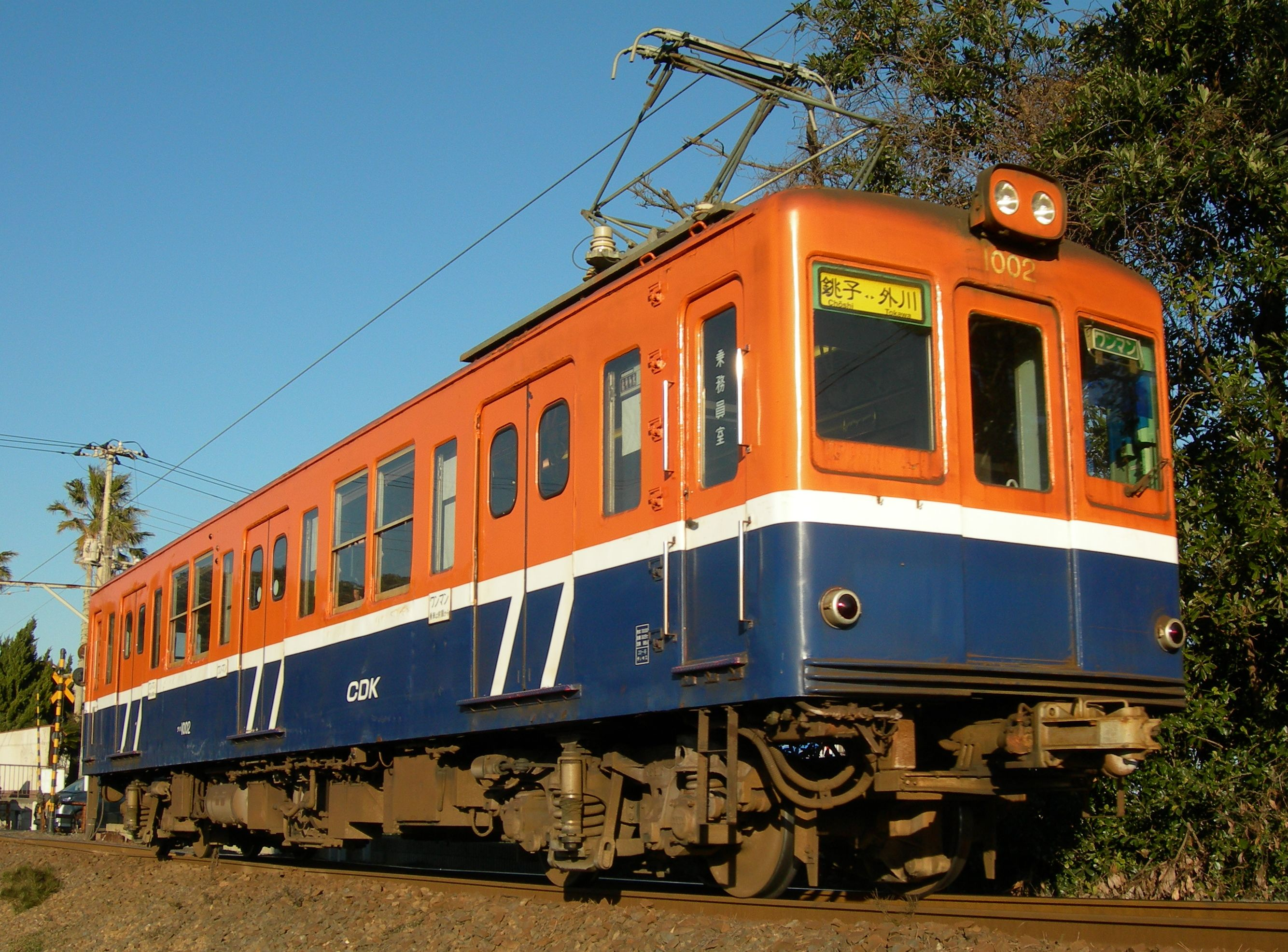
DeHa 1002 in "Tetsuko no Tabi" livery in January 2011

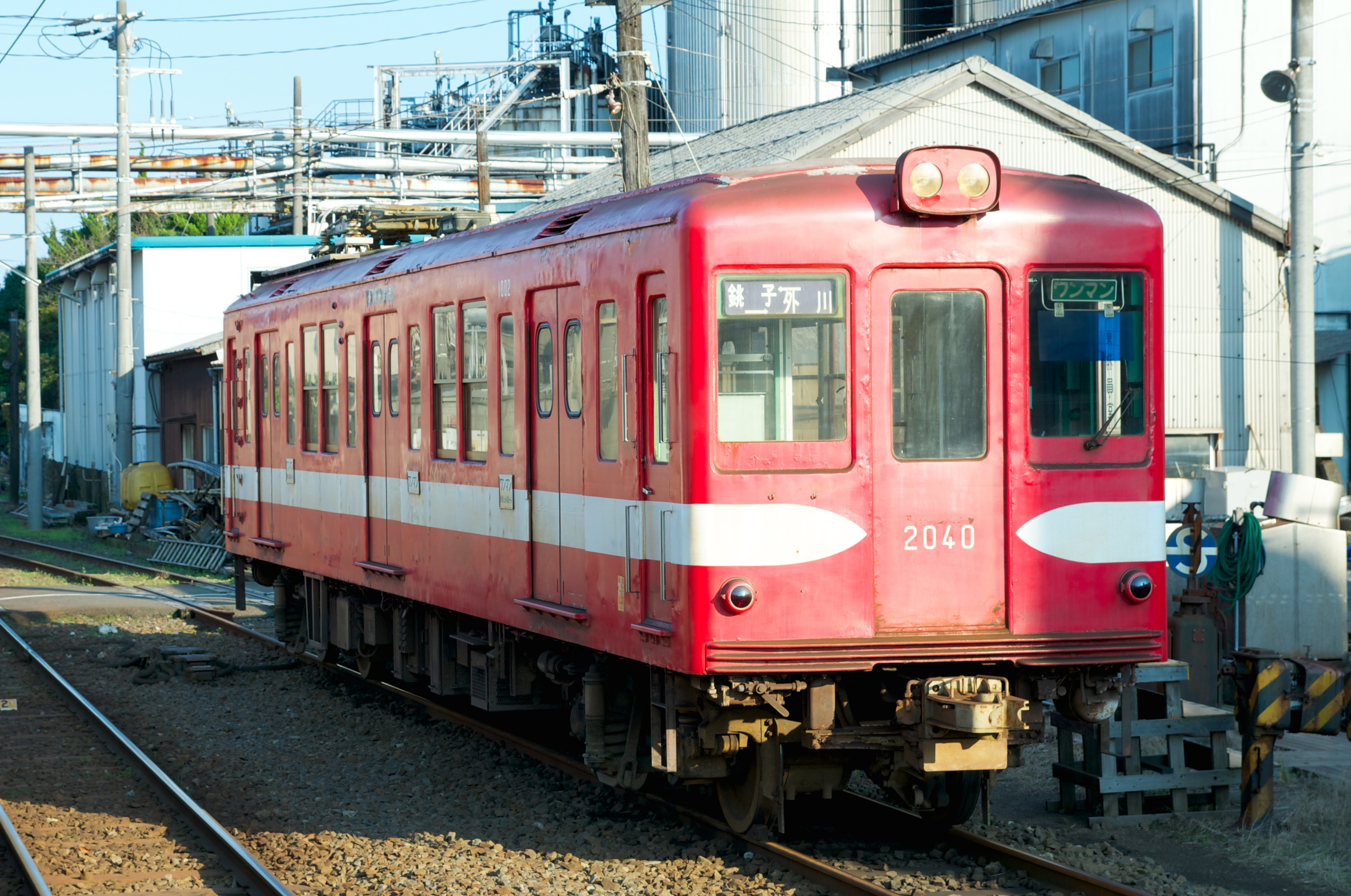
DeHa 1002 in "Marunouchi Line" livery and original TRTA number 2040 in November 2013

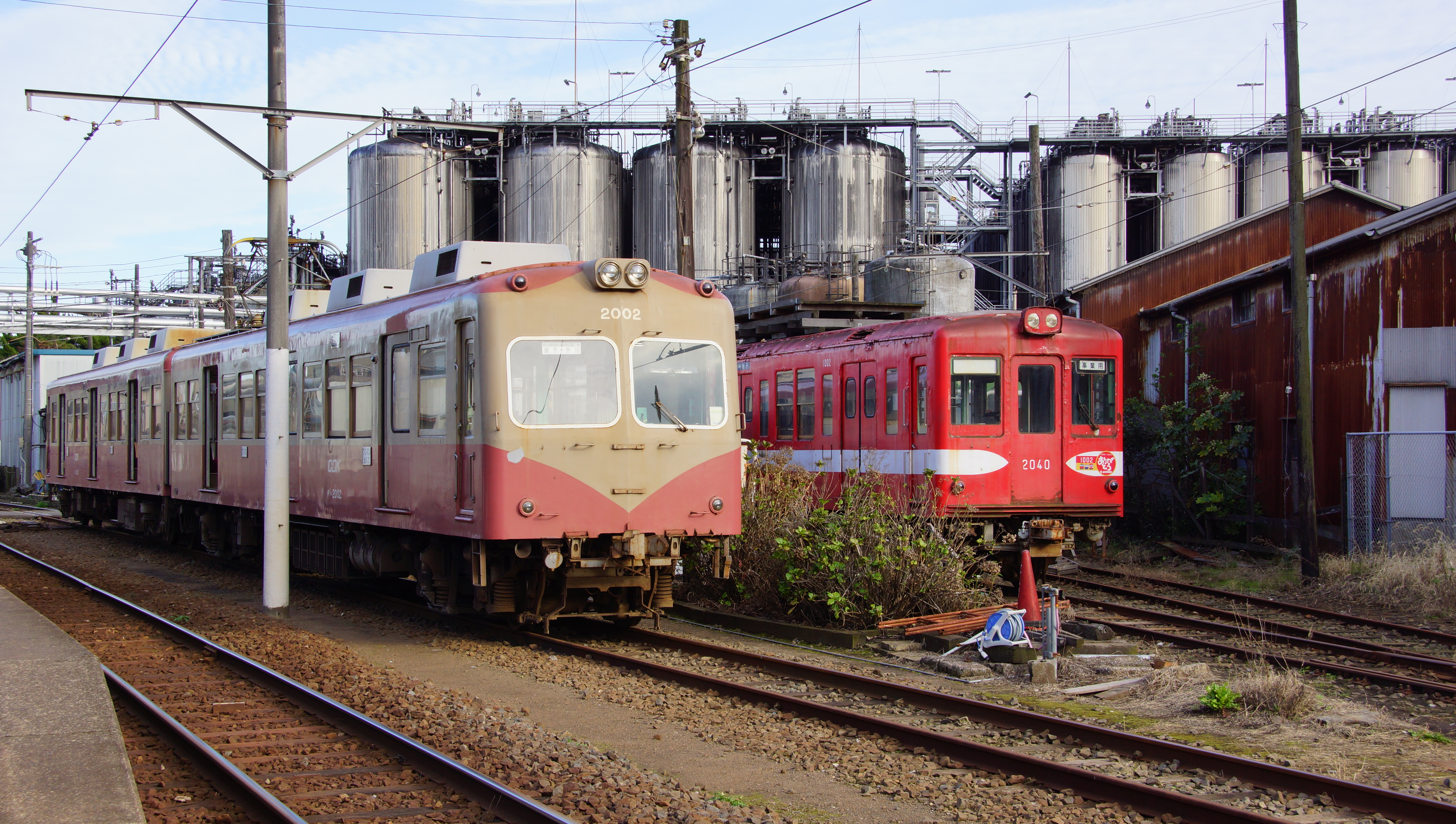
DeHa 1002 stored at Nakonocho Depot in November 2017

== Interior ==
The trains featured longitudinal seating, and were equipped with fare collection boxes at each end for wanman driver only operation. The trains did not have air-conditioning.

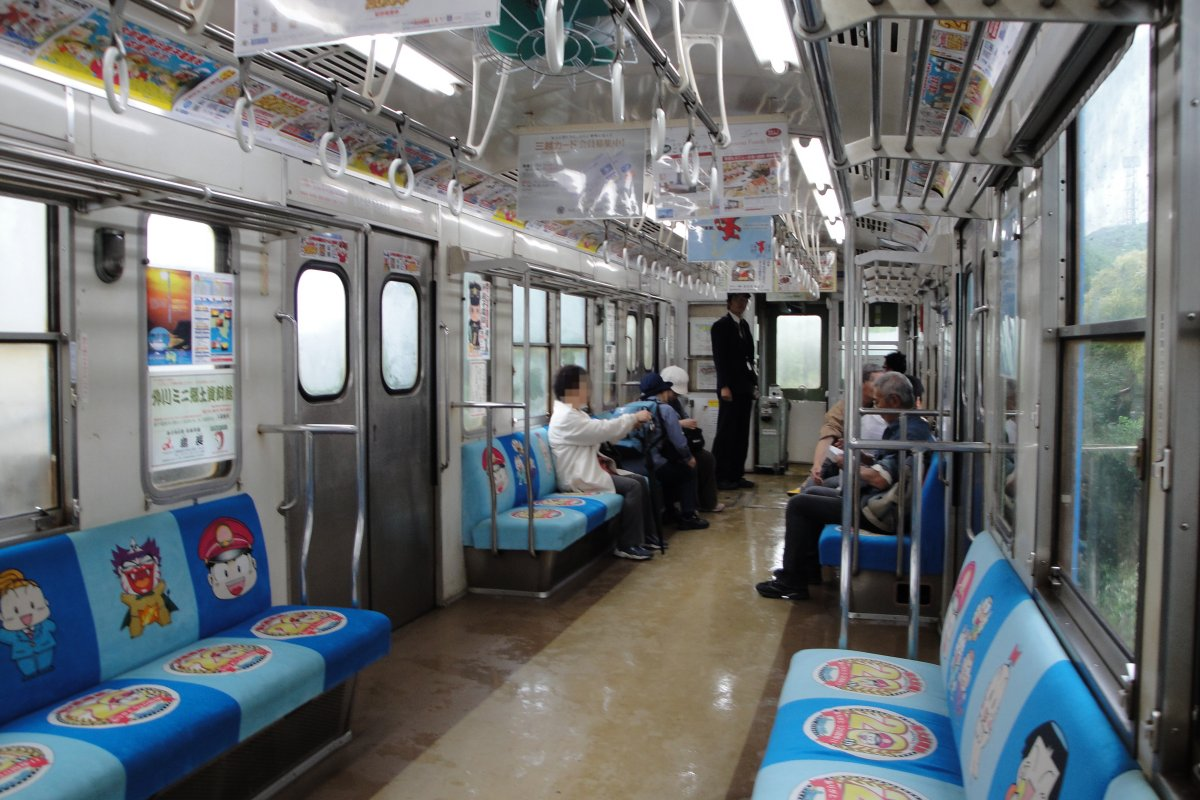
Interior view of "Momotaro Dentetsu" themed DeHa 1001 in June 2009

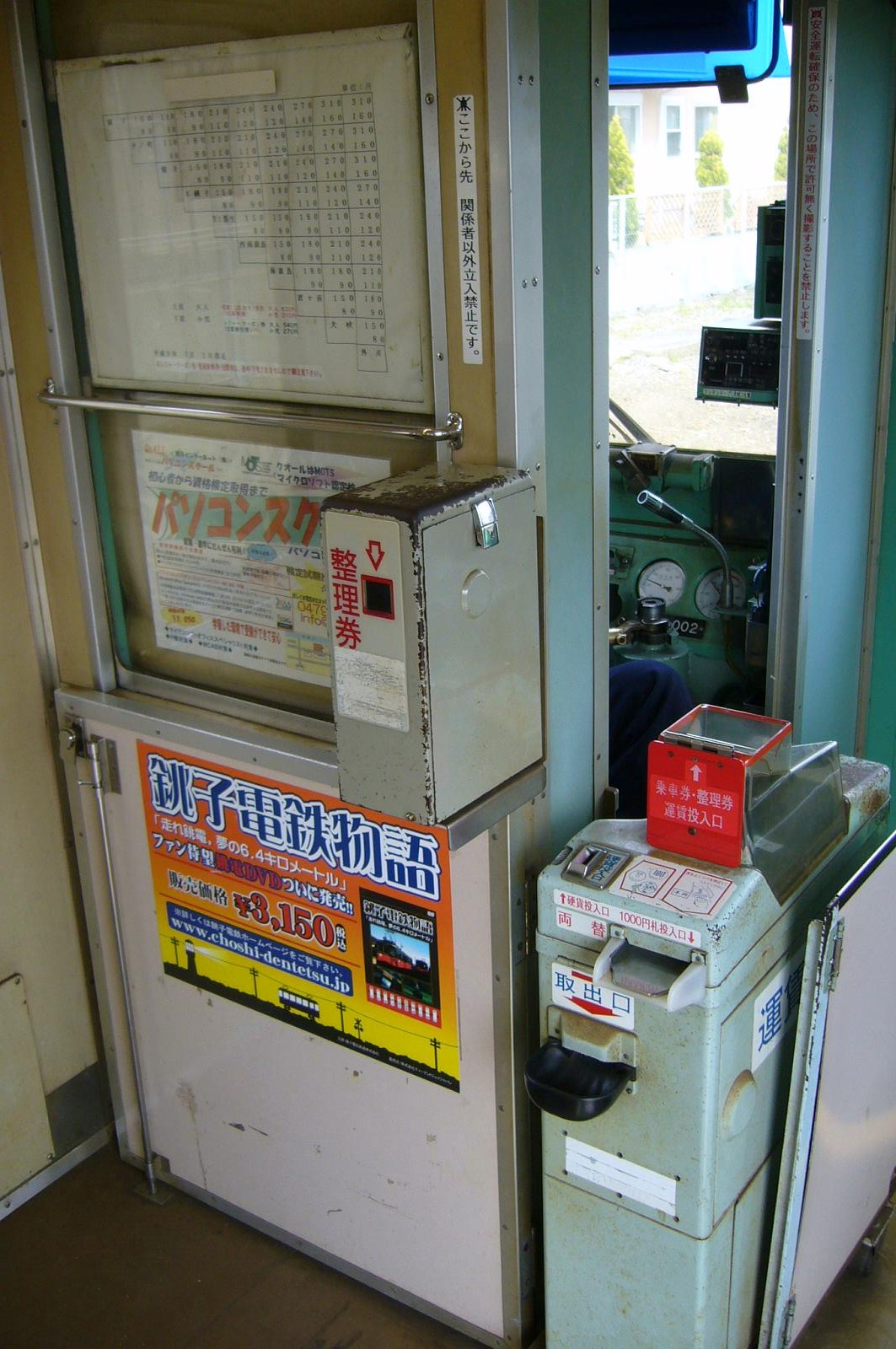
Fare collection box in DeHa 1002 in March 2008

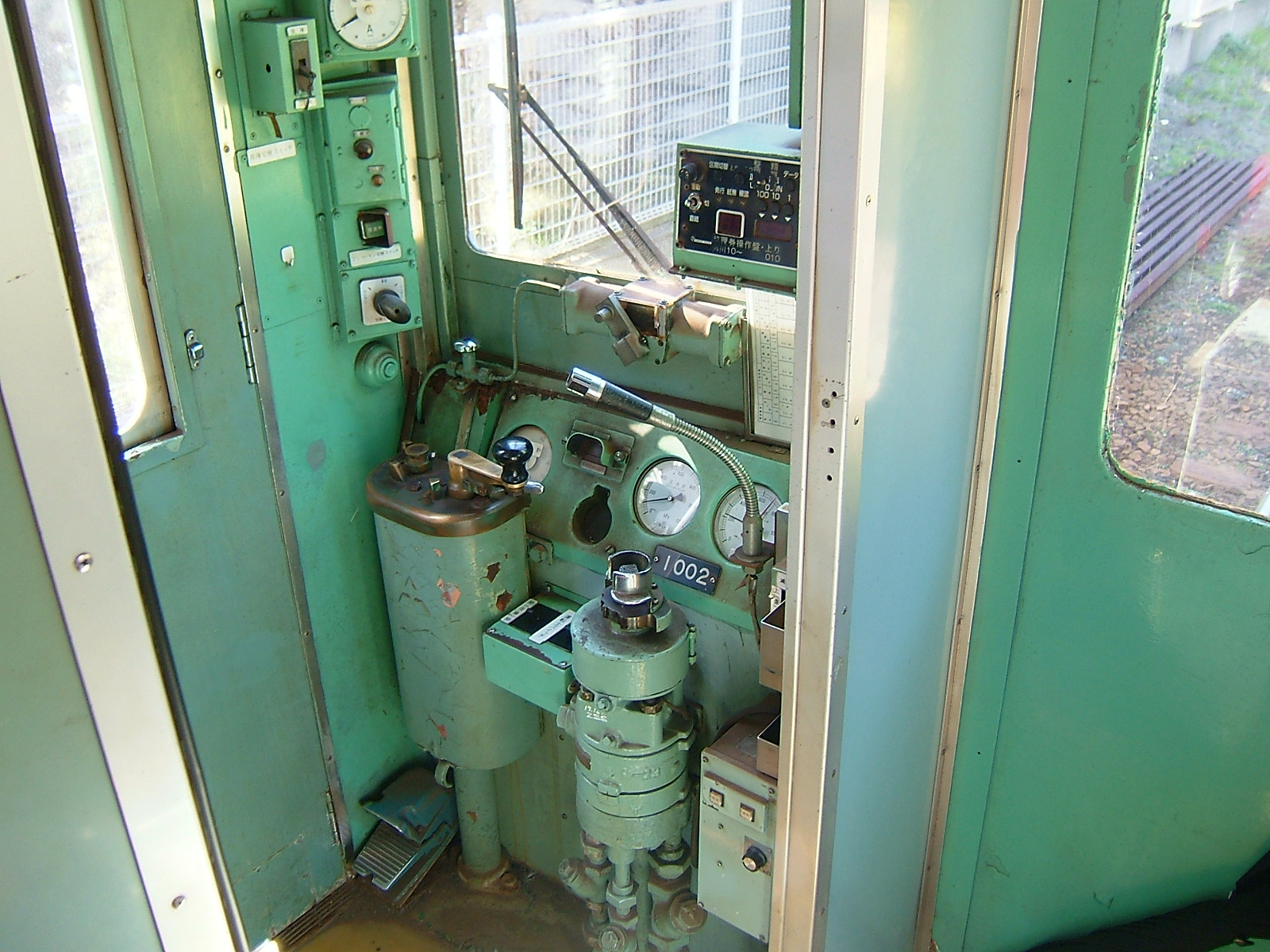
Driving cab of DeHa 1002 in March 2007

== Operations ==
The two units normally operated as single cars, but could be coupled and operated in multiple when two-car trains were required for increased capacity, such as when special events were held in the area.

== History ==
The two EMU cars were purchased from TRTA in 1994, and were modified for driver-only-operation and repainted at a cost of approximately 35 million yen per car. They entered revenue service from 29 August 1994.

DeHa 1001 was involved in a head-on collision with DeHa 701 north of Kasagami-Kurohae Station on 24 June 1995. The driving cab at the up (Choshi) end was badly damaged, and the car was sent to Keio Juuki Seibi for repairs.

In November 2014, it was announced that car 1002 would be withdrawn from service in early January 2015. The unit's final run in passenger service was on 10 January 2015, operating in multiple with sister unit 1001. Car 1001 was withdrawn following its last day in service on 28 February 2016.

== Preservation ==
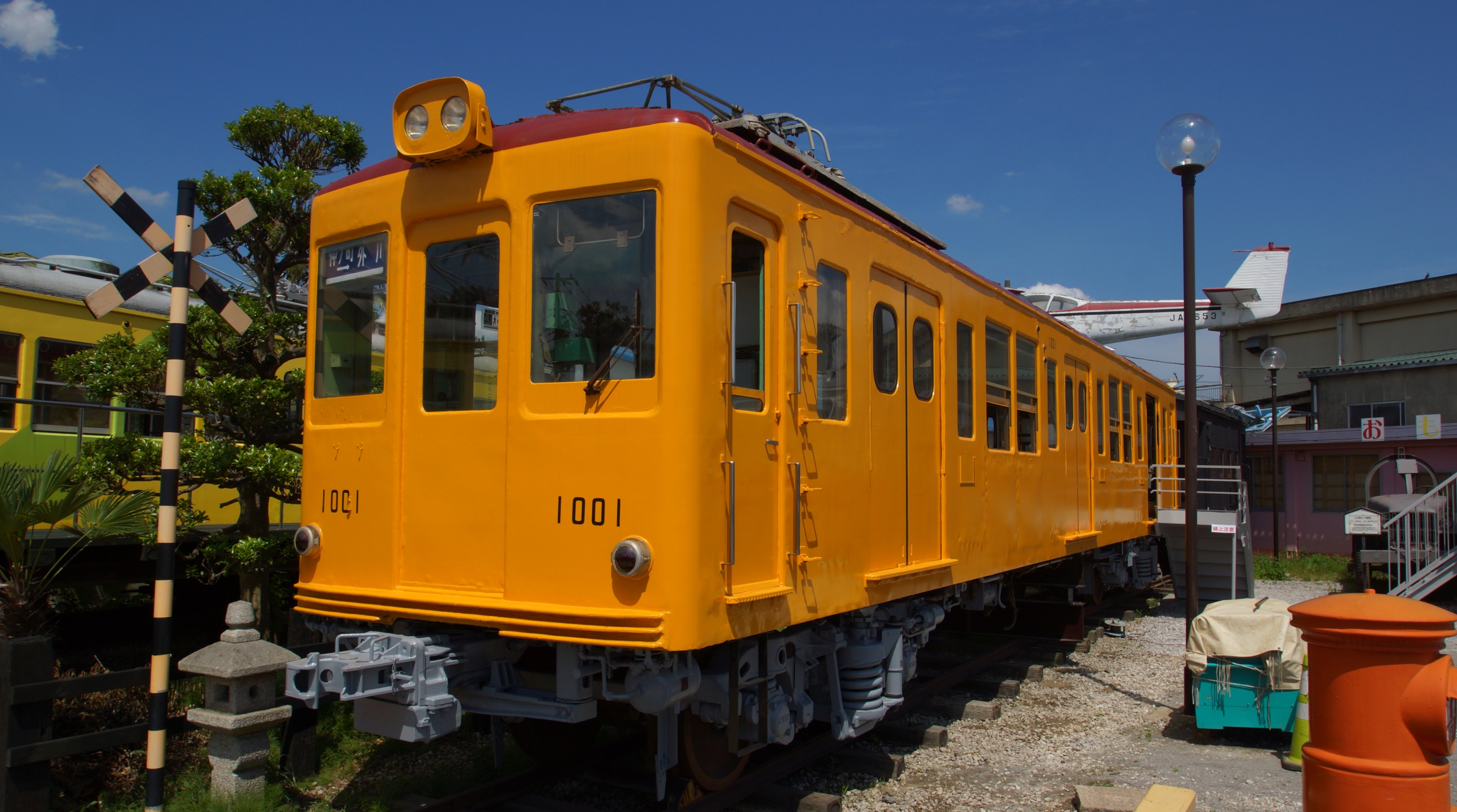
Car 1001 preserved at the Showa no Mori Museum in June 2016

Car 1001 is preserved at the Showa no Mori Museum in Matsudo, Chiba.
