= Choshi Electric Railway 100 series =

Class of 1 Japanese electric railcar

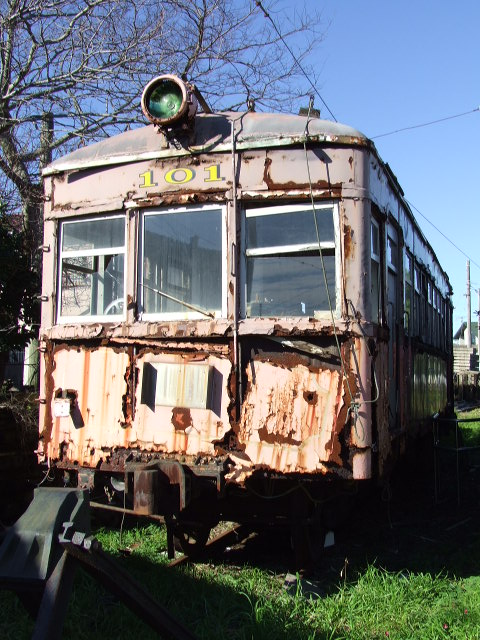
- DeHa 101 dumped at Kasagami-Kurohae Station, December 2006
- In service: 1939–1999
- Manufacturer: Nippon Tetsudō Jidōsha Kōgyō
- Constructed: 1939
- Refurbished: 1952
- Scrapped: 2009
- Number built: 1 vehicle
- Number in service: None
- Number scrapped: 1 vehicle
- Formation: Single car
- Fleet numbers: DeHa 101
- Capacity: 70 (28 seated)
- Operators: Choshi Electric Railway
- Depots: Nakanochō

Specifications
- Car body construction: Steel/wood
- Car length: 10,970 mm (36 ft 0 in)
- Width: 2,600 mm (8 ft 6 in)
- Height: 3,740 mm (12 ft 3 in)
- Doors: 2 sliding doors per side
- Weight: 15.7 t
- Traction system: 37.3 kW x2
- Power output: 74.6 kW
- Electric system(s): 600 V DC overhead wire
- Current collection: Bow collector
- Bogies: Amemiya
- Braking system(s): Air brakes
- Track gauge: 1,067 mm (3 ft 6 in)

The Choshi Electric Railway 100 series (銚子電鉄100形, Chōshi Dentetsu 100-gata) was an electric multiple unit (EMU) train type operated by the private railway operator Choshi Electric Railway in Chiba Prefecture, Japan, between 1939 and 1999.

== History ==
DeHa 101 was built in February 1939 by Nippon Tetsudō Jidōsha Kōgyō (日本鉄道自動車工業) (present-day Toyokouki) as "BoDeHa 101" (with "Bo" designating it as a bogie car) with a wood and steel body mounted on Amemiya plate-frame bogies donated from former Shimotsuke Electric Railway (下野電気鉄道) 1926-vintage 2 ft 6 in (762 mm) gauge DeHa 103 which previously operated on what is now the Tōbu Kinugawa Line and was withdrawn in July 1932.

On 9 May 1939, shortly after BoDeHa 101 entered service, Princess Shigeko (daughter of Emperor Hirohito) rode on the train from Chōshi to Tōdaimae (present-day Inuboh Station) and back on a Gakushūin school outing.

=== Rebuilding ===
BoDeHa 101 was renumbered DeHa 101 from 29 May 1950, and in December 1952, it was rebuilt by Nippon Tetsudō Jidōsha Kōgyō with a new steel and wood-frame body with air-operated sliding doors.

The original trolley pole current collector was replaced by a bow collector in 1966.

Following the introduction of DeHa 501 in the 1970s, DeHa 101 was used less frequently, and was often used as a non-powered car sandwiched between DeHa 301 and DeHa 501. It was also sometimes used to haul freight services in place of the electric locomotive DeKi 3.

=== Miotsukushi filming ===
In 1985, DeHa 101 was used extensively in filming for the NHK TV drama series Miotsukushi (澪つくし), which was shot on the Choshi Electric Railway. Budget limitations meant that the bow collector could not be replaced with its original trolley pole current collector, nor could the car be repainted into the period style livery of all-over brown.

=== Withdrawal and preservation ===
In later years, the car was used as a storeroom at Kasagami-Kurohae Station, and was officially withdrawn on 31 March 1999. It remained dumped at Kasagami-Kurohae Station until it was cut up on 27 September 2009. The Amemiya plate-frame bogies were preserved, however, with the Tokawa-end bogie donated to the Tobu Museum in Tokyo, and the Chōshi-end bogie preserved at Ōgo Depot on the Jōmō Electric Railway in Gunma Prefecture.

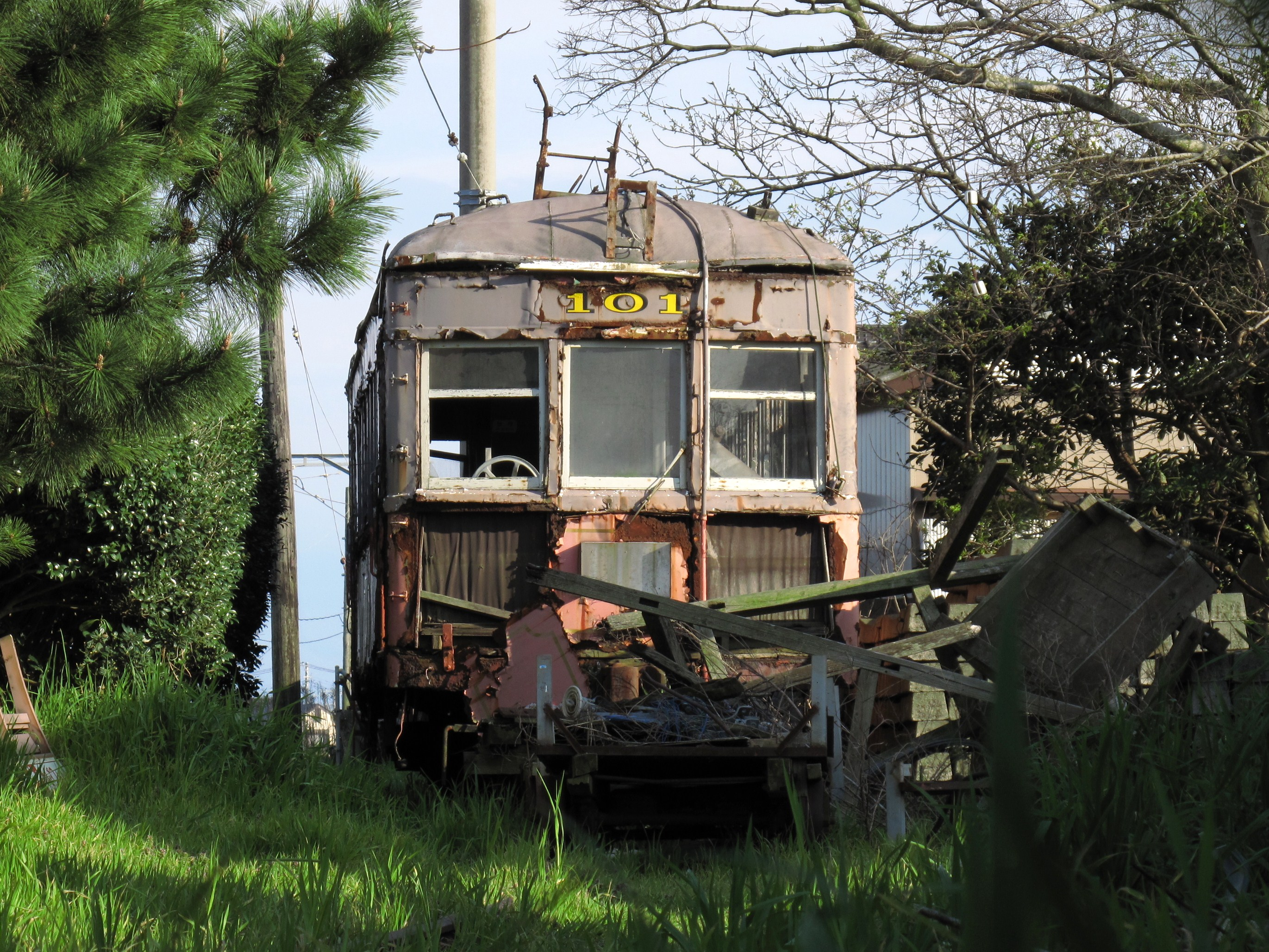
DeHa 101 dumped at Kasagami-Kurohae Station, March 2009

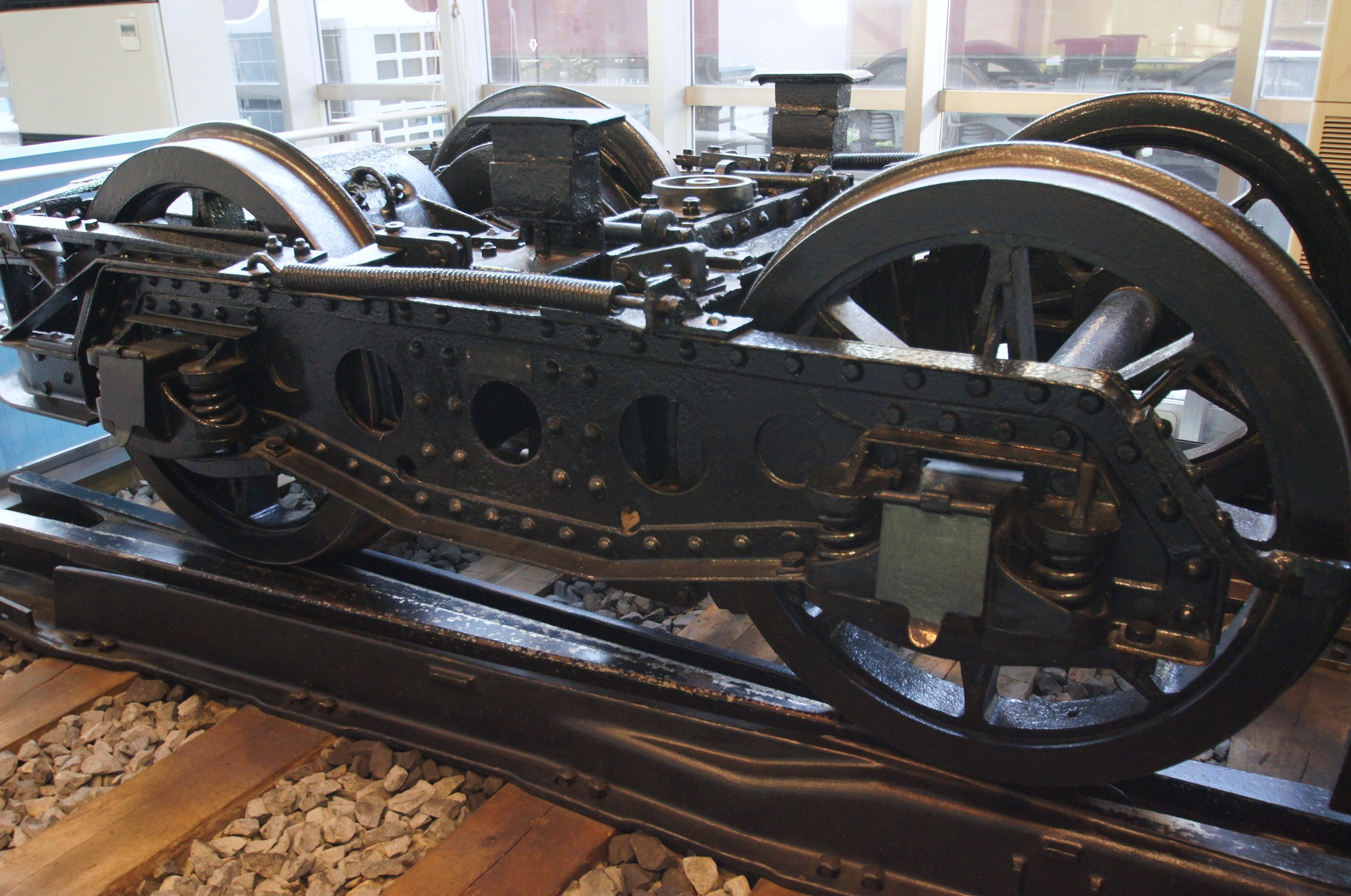
Amemiya plate-frame bogie formerly used on DeHa 101 preserved at the Tobu Museum in Tokyo
