= Series 2 =

Series 2 could refer to:

- Apple Watch Series 2, a smart watch by Apple
- Aston Martin Lagonda Series 2, the automobile model
- Aston Martin V8 Series 2, the automobile model
- BMW 2 Series, the automobile model line
- GeForce 2 series, line of nVidia video cards
- Scania 2-series, the truck model line
- GP2 Series, motor racing series
- Super2 Series, motor racing series
- South African Class 6E1, Series 2, electric locomotive series
- Cambrian Series 2, geological series

== See also ==
- 200 series (disambiguation)
- Class 2 (disambiguation)
- Model 2 (disambiguation)
- System 2 (disambiguation)
- Type 2 (disambiguation)
- Model 2 (disambiguation)

Preceded by Series 1 (disambiguation)	Series 2	Succeeded by Series 3 (disambiguation)
