= Type 2 =

Type 2 or Type II may refer to:

- Type 2 encryption
- Type II female genital mutilation
- Type-2 Gumbel distribution
- Type II keratin
- Type II error used in statistics for a "false negative" error
- Type II lattice
- Type II string theory
- Type-II superconductor
- Type II supernova
- Type 2 sequence
- Activin type 2 receptors
- Atelosteogenesis, type II
- Belgian State Railways Type 2, a class of 0-6-0 locomotives built 1874–1884
- British Railways Type 2 Diesel locomotives
- Diabetes mellitus type 2
- Glutaric acidemia type 2
- Glycogen storage disease type II
- Hyper-IgM syndrome type 2
- Hyperfinite type II factor
- Type 2 connector, used for charging electric vehicles
- IEC 62196 Type 2 connector type (alias Mennekes Type 2)
- JDBC type 2 driver
- Motorola Type II
- Multiple endocrine neoplasia type 2
- Neurofibromatosis type II
- R-Type II
- Type I and type II errors
- Type II civilization, an advanced civilization on the Kardashev scale.
- IEC Type II, one of the four "type" classifications of audio cassette formulation

== Weapons ==
- German Type II submarine
- Type 2 Ho-I, a Japanese tank
- Type 2 Ka-Mi, a Japanese tank
- Type II, a Japanese submachine gun
- Type 2 12 cm Mortar, a Japanese weapon
- Type 2 20 mm AA machine cannon, a Japanese weapon
- Type 2 AT mine
- Type 2 cannon, a 30 mm Japanese weapon

== Vehicles ==
- Volkswagen Type 2 (T3)
- Volkswagen Type 2
- Peugeot Type 2
- Kawanishi H8K, Type 2 flying boat (code named Emily)
- Cooper 500, aka Cooper Type 2, a single seater racing car

== Others ==
Type 2 may also refer to

- Albinism
- Charcot–Marie–Tooth disease
- Type-2 language in the Chomsky hierarchy of formal languages, a.k.a. context-free language
- Compact Font Format
- CompactFlash
- Cyclic permutation
- Dbx (noise reduction)
- Gaucher's disease
- Hypersensitivity
- PC Card
- Second-degree atrioventricular block
- Spinal muscular atrophy
- Topoisomerase
- Usher syndrome
- Von Willebrand disease

== See also ==
- Class 2 (disambiguation)
- Model 2 (disambiguation)
- Series 2 (disambiguation)
- System 2 (disambiguation)
