= Belgian State Railways Type 29 =

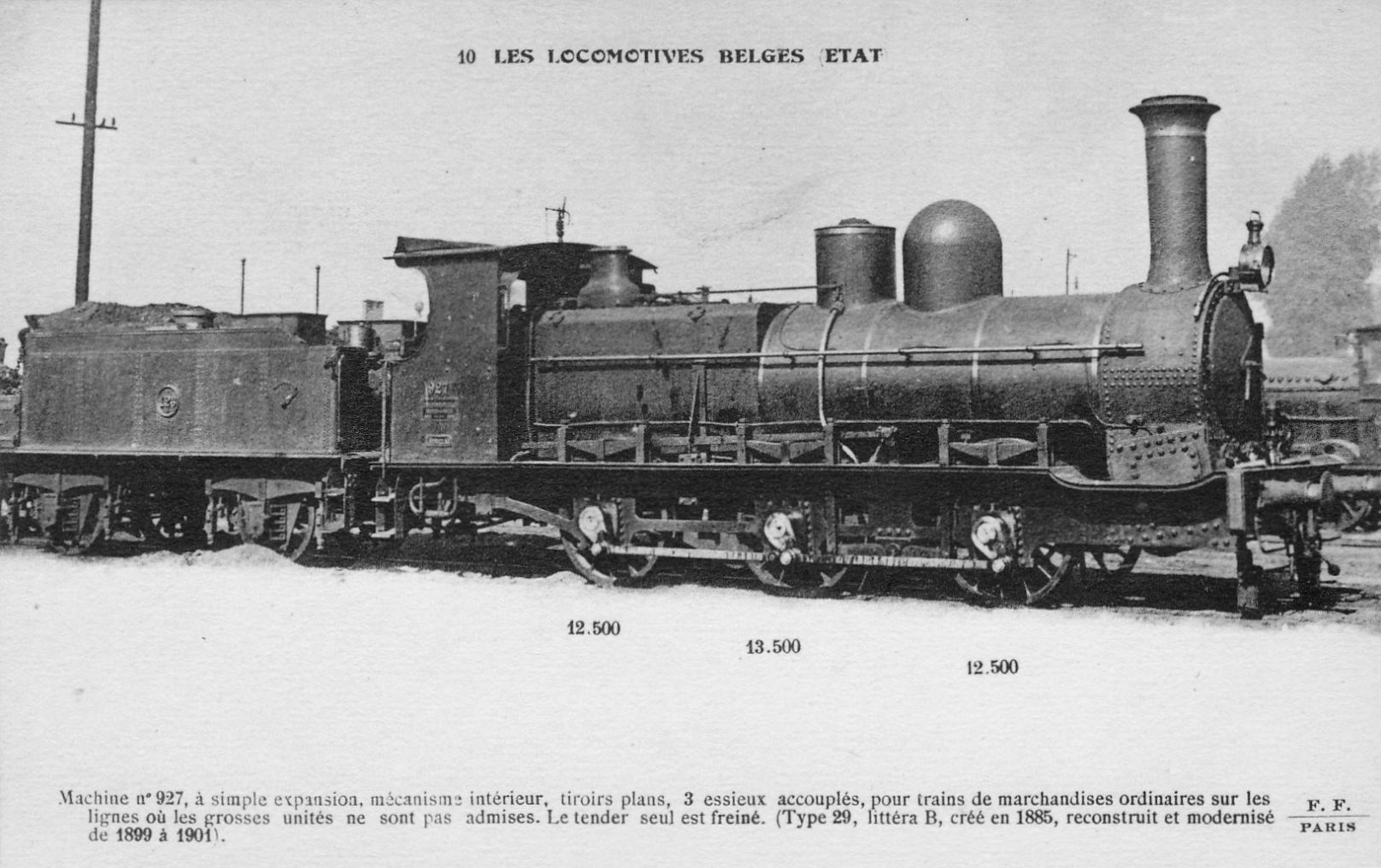
Type and origin
- Power type: Steam
- Build date: 1875–1891
- Total produced: 524 + 48 rebuilt from Type 2 and Type 28
Specifications
- Configuration
  - Whyte: 0-6-0
  - UIC: C n2
- Gauge: 1,435 mm (4 ft 8 1/2 in)
- Driver dia.: 1,300 mm (4 ft 3 1/8 in)
- Wheelbase: 4.0 m (13 ft 1 1/2 in)
- Length: 9.338 m (30 ft 7.6 in)
- Loco weight: 38.3 t (84,000 lb)
- Firebox
  - Type: Belpaire
  - Grate area: 2.7667 m^{2} (29.781 sq ft)
- Boiler pressure: 9 atm (0.912 MPa; 132 psi)
- Heating surface: 109.383 m^{2} (1,177.39 sq ft)
- Cylinders: Two, inside
- Cylinder size: 450 mm × 600 mm (17.72 in × 23.62 in)
- Valve gear: Stephenson
Performance figures
- Tractive effort: 5,648 kg (12,452 lb)
Career
- Operators: Belgian State Railways
- Class: Type 29

The Belgian State Railways Type 29 was a class of 0-6-0 steam locomotives for freight service, introduced in 1875.

== Construction history ==
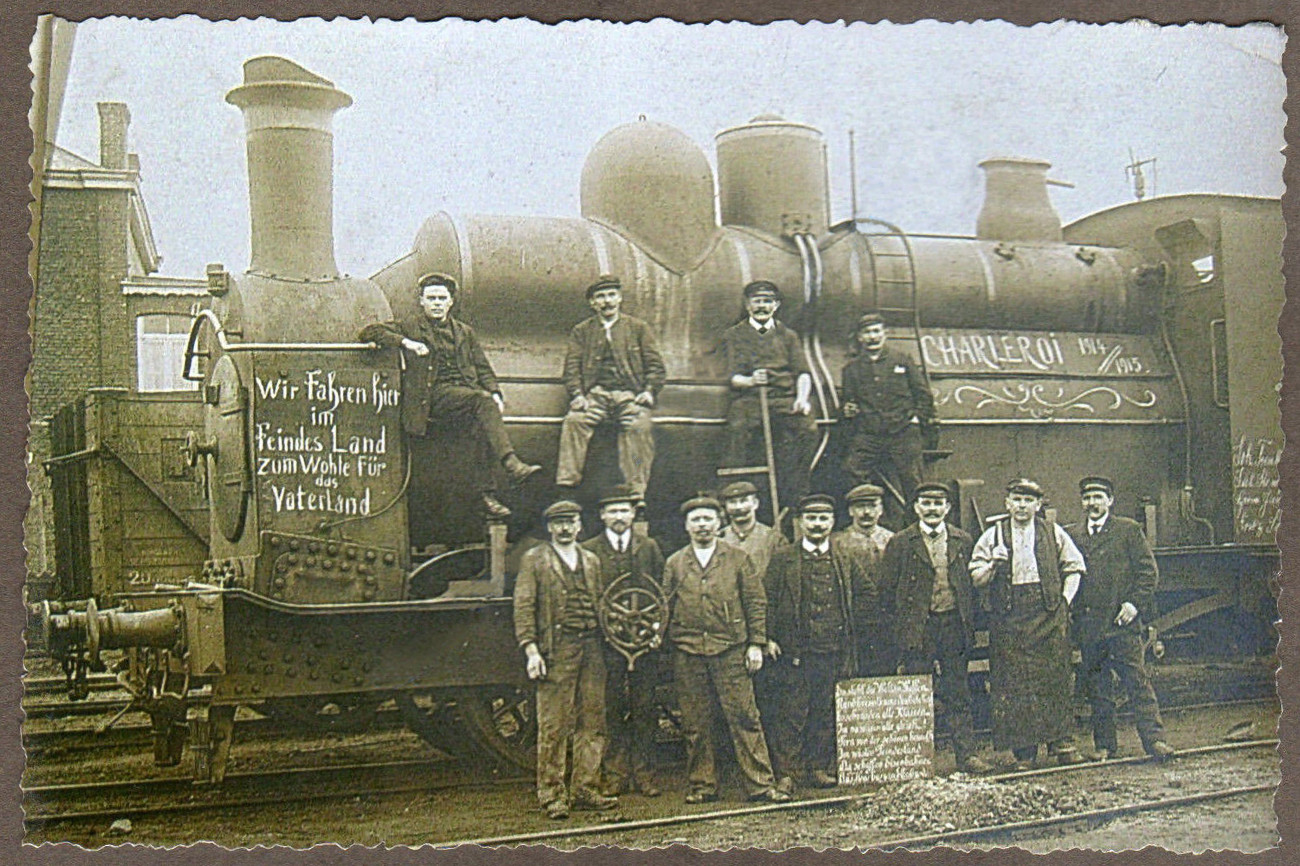
Type 29 rebuilt with a Brotan water-tube boiler.

The locomotives were built in two main series, the first series from 1875 to 1884 and the second from 1898 to 1901. The later machines differed by the dimensions of the boiler, the shelter, suspension and appearance of the smoke box. Some of the older series were eventually reboilered.

The Type 29 was very similar to the Type 28, from which it differed mainly in the diameter of the wheels (1.30 m instead of 1.45 m) and some details of the chassis. The machines used a Belpaire firebox and had an outside frame with the cylinders and the Stephenson valve gear located inside the frame.
