= Class 02 =

Class 02 may refer to:

- British Rail Class 02, a class of post-war, British diesel-hydraulic locomotive designed for shunting duties
- DRG Class 02, a class of German, standard steam locomotive with a four-cylinder compound configuration
- LSWR O2 Class, a class of sixty nineteenth century steam locomotives designed by William Adams for suburban passenger services on the London and South Western Railway

== See also ==
- Class II (disambiguation)
- Class 2 (disambiguation)
