= MIIS =

MIIS is an acronym that could refer to a number of things.

- Middlebury Institute of International Studies at Monterey, a graduate school in California
- MIIS (programming language), a computer programming language
- Microsoft Identity Integration Server, Microsoft server software for identity and access management solutions
- Mii, a simulated avatar created on the Wii, DS, Wii U, 3DS, and Switch consoles
- Seat Mii, a car that is a rebadge of the Volkswagen Up
- Multiple Intelligence International School, an international school in Metro Manila, Philippines

== See also ==
- MII (disambiguation)
- mi2 (disambiguation)
