= Scania 4-series =

Scania Four-Series
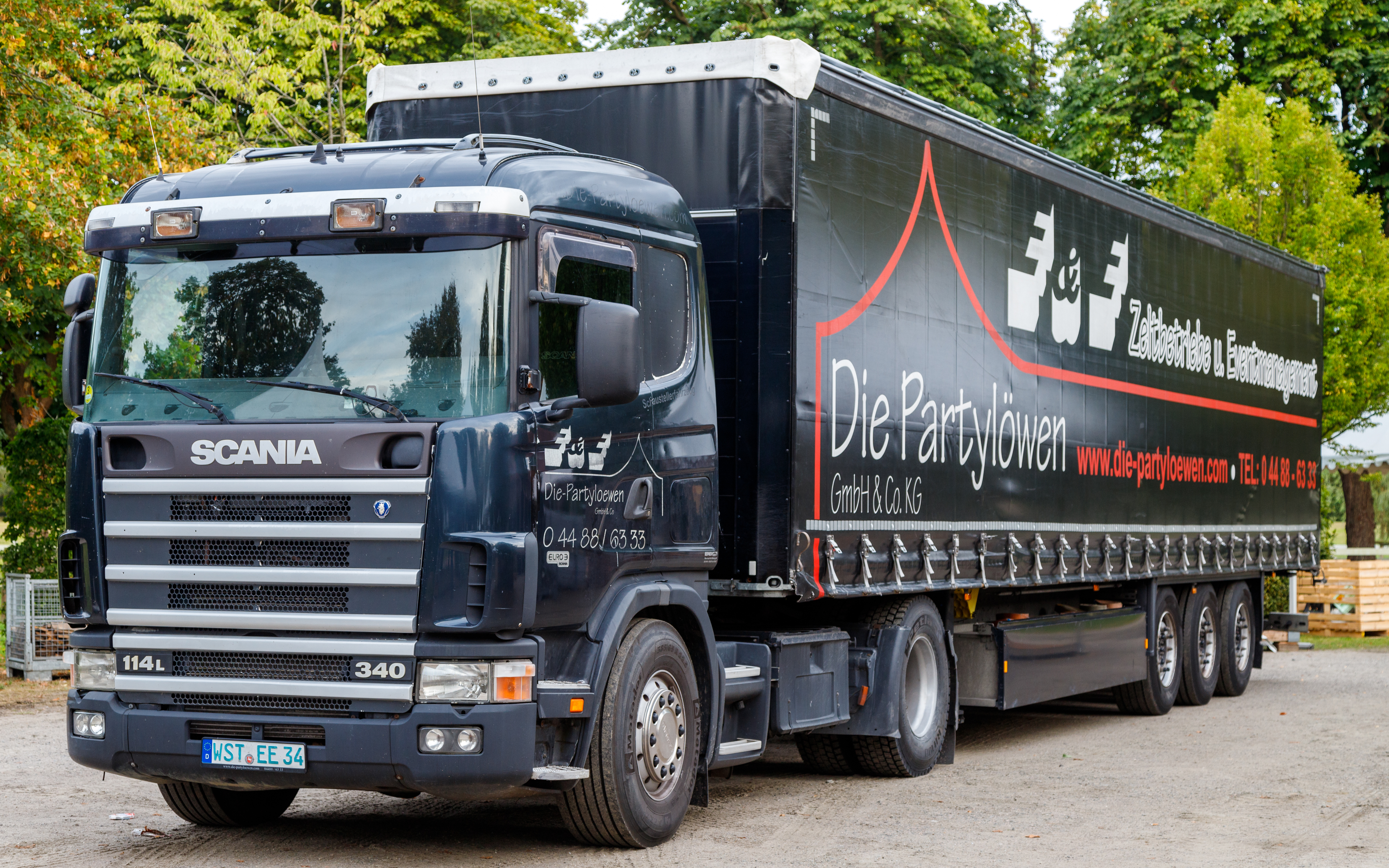

Overview
- Manufacturer: Scania
- Production: 1995−2005
- Assembly: Södertälje, Sweden (Scania AB) Johor, Malaysia

Body and chassis
- Class: Heavy truck
- Body style: COE: Day cab; Day-Low cab; Low cab; Normal cab; Topline; Longline; Conventional

Chronology
- Predecessor: Scania 3-series
- Successor: Scania PRT-range

The Scania 4-series, is a truck model range which was introduced by Scania in 1995. It was the successor of the 3-series and it came in five engine combinations, three cabs and four chassis types. The 4-series was succeeded by the PRT-range in Europe in 2005, but production continued in Brazil until 2007.

== Designations ==
Engine size

The engine sizes are 9, 11, 12, 14 and 16 litres - as usual for the 1-4 series except the new 12 and 16 litre engines - shown in the model name with a number constructed by the cylinder volume in litres followed by the generation of truck. This way a 14-litre engine in the 4-series will be a 144.

Chassis type

The letter, following the number describes the chassis type, but in the 4-series this code changed compared to former series (L, D, C and G in 4-series vs M, H and E on the 3 series). The 3-digit number on the opposite corner in the front stands for horse power. This ranges from 220 to 580 hp.

== Styling ==
The 4-series changed the well-known Scania front look from quite square and lined to new round and curved shapes. The new cab design also split the grille horizontally in two, making the lower part flip down to make a step usable for better reach when cleaning windows or optionally as a bench while waiting somewhere.

== See also ==
- Scania 2-series
