= Belgian State Railways Type 28 =

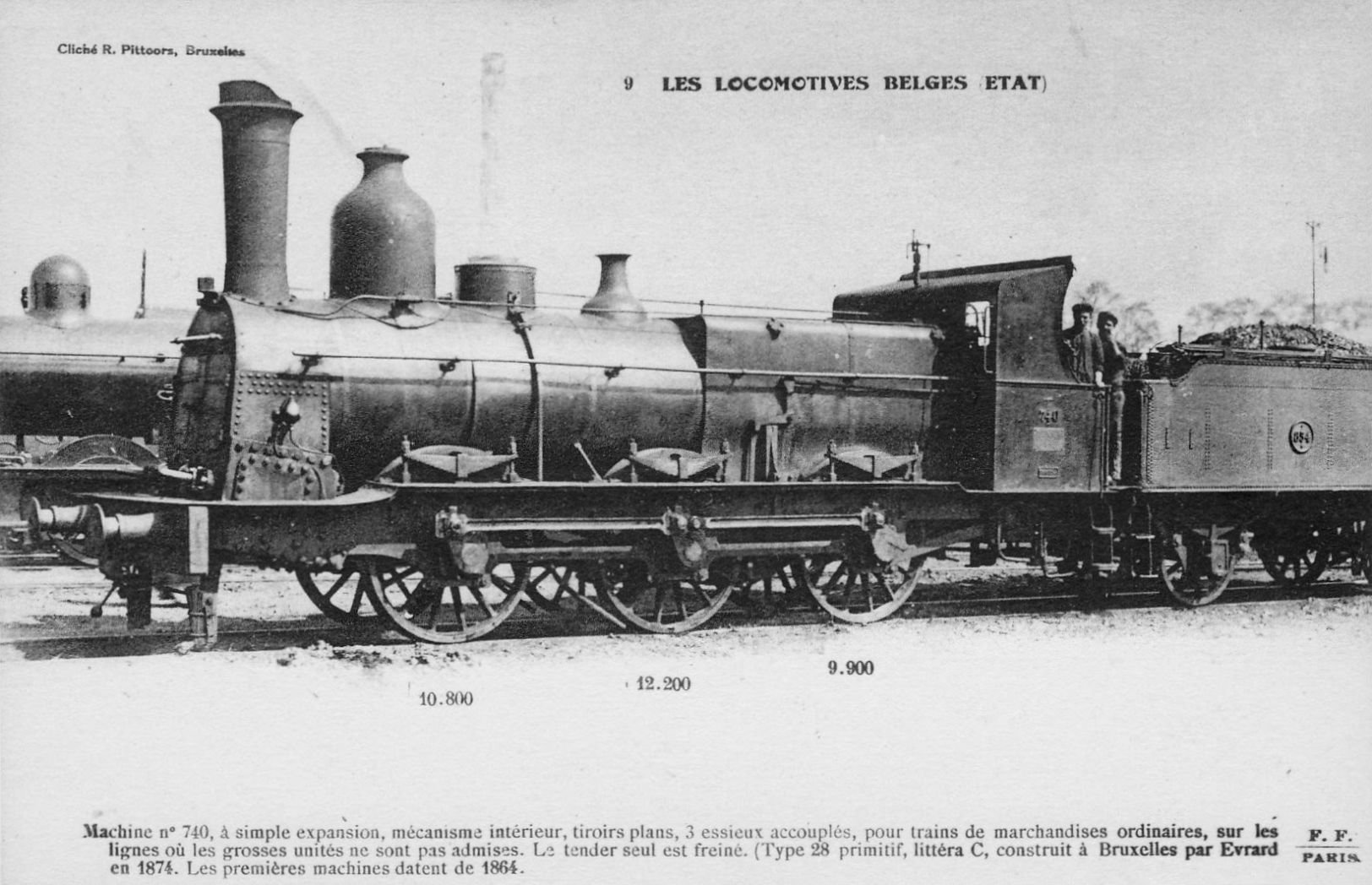
Type and origin
- Power type: Steam
- Build date: 1864–1883
- Total produced: 253
Specifications
- Configuration
  - Whyte: 0-6-0
  - UIC: C n2
- Gauge: 1,435 mm (4 ft 8 1/2 in)
- Driver dia.: 1,450 mm (4 ft 9 1/8 in)
- Wheelbase: 4.0 m (13 ft 1 1/2 in)
- Length: 9.338 m (30 ft 7.6 in)
- Loco weight: 33–36.4 t (73,000–80,000 lb)
- Firebox
  - Type: Belpaire
  - Grate area: 2.7667 m^{2} (29.781 sq ft)
- Boiler pressure: 8 atm (0.811 MPa; 118 psi)
- Heating surface: 109.383 m^{2} (1,177.39 sq ft)
- Cylinders: Two, inside
- Cylinder size: 450 mm × 600 mm (17.72 in × 23.62 in)
- Valve gear: Stephenson
Performance figures
- Tractive effort: 8 atm: 4,490 kgf (44 kN; 9,899 lbf); 9 atm: 5,055 kgf (50 kN; 11,144 lbf)
Career
- Operators: Belgian State Railways
- Class: Type 28
- Withdrawn: c. 1926

The Belgian State Railways Type 28 was a class of 0-6-0 goods steam locomotives introduced in 1864.

== Construction history ==
The class was built from 1864 to 1883 by various Belgian manufacturers, with 9 additional locomotives built by Schneider - Le Creusot and 10 by Maschinenbau-Gesellschaft Karlsruhe. The class had Belpaire fireboxes, external frames and internal cylinders connected by Stephenson valve gear.

Known production numbers (Type 28)
Manufacturer / Factory numbers	Quantity	Date in service	État Belge numbers / Note
Cockerill 600 – 609	10	Apr 1865 – Jul 1865	EB 281 – 290
Cockerill 612, 615	2	Oct 1867	EB 32, 8
Cockerill 657 – 665	9	Oct 1866 – Dec 1866	EB 179, 52, 46, 74, 22, 164, 126, 150, 113
Cockerill 679	1	1868	EB 389
Cockerill 686, 685, 684, 683, 682	5	Jun 1870 – Jul 1870	EB 944 – 948 (former GCL 97 – 101)
Cockerill 759 – 763	5	Dec 1871 – Jan 1872	EB 582 – 586
Cockerill 825 – 829	5	Sep 1872 – Nov 1872	EB 622 – 626
Cockerill 921 – 930	10	May 1874 – Jun 1874	EB 570 – 571, 573 – 574, 762 – 767
Cockerill 1234 – 1240	7	1882	EB 1476, 1478 – 1483
Cockerill 1334 – 1347	14	1882 – 1883	EB 1614 – 1627
Saint-Léonard 244 – 247	4	1865	EB 62, 2, 99, 260
Saint-Léonard 351 – 357	7	Jun 1871 – Dec 1871	EB 6, 23, 69, 88, 114, 203 – 204
Saint-Léonard 360 – 363	4	Dec 1871 – Jan 1872	EB 592 – 595
Saint-Léonard 371 – 375	5	Apr 1872 – Jun 1872	EB 612 – 616
Saint-Léonard 382 – 390	9	Jul 1872 – Nov 1872	EB 661 – 669
Saint-Léonard 412 – 421	10	Apr 1873 – Dec 1873	EB 721 – 730
Saint-Léonard 422 – 431	10	Mar 1874 – Jul 1874	EB 475, 539, 545, 554, 555, 562, 563, 566, 568, 569
Saint-Léonard 437 – 442	6	Dec 1874 – Apr 1875	EB 830 – 835
Saint-Léonard 445 – 450	6	Apr 1876 – Aug 1876	EB 1038 – 1043
Saint-Léonard 612 – 625	14	1883	État Belge
Saint-Léonard 928	1	1892	EB 718 (former CF Liége–Maestricht 8)
Saint-Léonard 1126	1	1898	CF de la Flandre-Occidentale
Evrard 67 – 69	3	Jun 1867 – Jul 1867	EB 297 – 299
Evrard 93 – 102	10	Nov 1866 – Apr 1867	EB 365 – 374
Evrard 168 – 173	6	Jan 1872 – Feb 1872	EB 587 – 591, 596
Evrard 184 – 191	8	Nov 1872 – Feb 1873	EB 617 – 621, 631 – 633
Evrard 228 – 237	9	Mar 1874 – May 1874	EB 733, 731 – 732, 734 – 738, 740, 739
Evrard 253 – 262	10	Jun 1874 – Sep 1874	EB 131, 149, 181, 87, 29, 34, 53, 184, 430, 472
Evrard 275	1	Jun 1875	EB 836
Evrard 372, 374, 379 – 380	4	1882	EB 1472 – 1475
Couillet 155 – 158	4	Jul 1865 - Sep 1865	EB 311 – 314
Couillet	1	Aug 1865	EB 300
Couillet 164 – 166	3	Mar 1865 – Aug 1865	EB 316 – 318
Couillet	2	Jan 1866	EB 319 – 320
Couillet 175 – 183	9	Jan 1866 – Dec 1866	EB 10, 9, 16, 19, 31, 51, 61, 72, 134
Couillet 259 – 266	8	Jul 1872 – Dec 1872	EB 607 – 611, 634 – 636
Couillet 269 – 274	6	Dec 1873 – Mar 1873	EB 675, 670 – 674
Couillet 306 – 310	5	Aug 1874 – Oct 1874	EB 799, 801, 803, 805, 807
Couillet 546 – 552	7	Nov 1881 – Jan 1882	EB 1477, 1466 – 1471
Tubize 56 (Note: Tubize 56 (prototype EB 296) and 57 – 59 (EB 315 – 317) according to Delporte (2018))	1	Aug 1865	EB 315
Tubize 143 – 148	6	Oct 1871 – Jan 1872	EB 602, 597 – 601
Tubize 158 – 166 (Note: Tubize 159 – 167 according to Delporte (2018))	9	Feb 1872 – Dec 1872	EB 627 – 630, 676 – 680
Tubize 271 – 275	5	May 1874 – Jul 1874	EB 798, 800, 802, 804, 806
Tubize 546 – 552	7	1883	EB 1635 – 1641
Karlsruhe 286 – 295	10	Dec 1866 – Apr 1867	EB 350 – 359
Schneider - Le Creusot 1046 – 1054	9	Aug 1867 – Oct 1867	EB 111, 115, 120, 151, 170, 199, 376 – 378
Haine-Saint-Pierre 119	1	1877	EB 94
Haine-Saint-Pierre 196 – 202	7	1883	EB 1628 – 1634
Carels 160 – 164	5	1881 – 1882	EB 1484 – 1488

They received new boilers in 1889, 1896 and 1898. The Arsenal of Mechelen rebuilt several old Type 30 and 33 to the Type 28's design^{bis}. Several were rebuilt as Type 29, Type 2 and Type 2^{bis}.

Overview of production quantities (Type 28, 29, 2, 2^{bis})
Manufacturer	Years	Type 28	Type 29	Type 2	Type 2^{bis}	Note
Cockerill		overall 180 (Type 28, 29, 2)				Belgian State Railways
Tubize		23	90	4	7	Belgian State Railways
Saint-Léonard	1865–1883	75				Belgian State Railways: 1865–1875 (61), 1883 (14)
Saint-Léonard	1892	1				Chemin de fer Liége–Maestricht
Saint-Léonard	1898	1				Chemin de fer de la Flandre Occidentale
Saint-Léonard	1876–1898		48			Belgian State Railways
Couillet	1865–1874	35				Belgian State Railways
Couillet	1875–1885			27		Belgian State Railways
Couillet	1876–1890		128			Belgian State Railways
Franco-Belge		54				Belgian State Railways
Franco-Belge	1873			36		Belgian State Railways (32), Russia (4)
Franco-Belge	1875		39			Belgian State Railways
Haine-Saint-Pierre	1876–1899		41			Belgian State Railways
Haine-Saint-Pierre		1		19	2	Belgian State Railways
La Meuse			6			Belgian State Railways
Carels Frères		5	58	15		Belgian State Railways
Boussu	1889		5			Belgian State Railways
Zimmermann-Hanrez	1883–1884, 1899		11			Belgian State Railways
Schneider - Le Creusot		9				Belgian State Railways
Maschinenbau-Gesellschaft Karlsruhe		10				Belgian State Railways

== Bibliography ==
- Tordeur, Emile (1909). Le Machiniste des Chemins de Fer Belges (in French).
- Dambly, Phil (Oct 1966). "Nos inoubliables vapeurs - Troisième période, 1864-1884 - Régime Belpaire". Le Rail (in French). No. 122.
- Vandenberghen, J. (1987). IV. Période Belpaire 1864–1883 (in French). Bruxelles: SNCB.
- Dagant, André (1974). "Cent vingt-cinq ans de construction de locomotives à vapeur en Belgique". Bulletin de l'Institut archéologique liégeois (in French). 86. Liège: Maison Curtius: 23–244.
- Société de Saint-Léonard (1903). Catalogue de présentation - avec une planche par locomotive (PDF) (in French). Liège.
- Delporte, Luc (12 Oct 2018). "Locomotive à marchandises, mixtes et à voyageurs – Tubize type 11 (type 28, 29, 2 et 2bis EB)". Musée 'de la Porte'.
