= System 3 =

System 3, System/3 or System III may refer to:

== Computing and electronics ==
- Acorn System 3, a home computer produced by Acorn Computers from 1980
- Cromemco System Three, a home computer produced by Cromemco from 1978
- IBM System/3, a low-end business computer manufactured between 1969 and 1985
- IBM System/3X, a line of general business midrange computers manufactured from 1975
- Operating System/3, operating system made by UNIVAC
- System Software 3, operating system made by Apple
- System 3 (software company), a software development firm
- UNIX System III, operating system released by AT&T
- Zenith System 3, a line of television models by Zenith Electronics

== Other ==
- System 3 in Trilogy, album by Criss Angel and Klay Scott
- System 3 FC, a football club in St Vincent and the Grenadines
- STS-3 (Space Transportation System-3), the Space Shuttle mission

== See also ==
- Series 3 (disambiguation)

| Preceded by System 2 (disambiguation) | System 3 | Succeeded by System 4 (disambiguation) |
