= Scania PRT-range =

Range of modular trucks from Scania

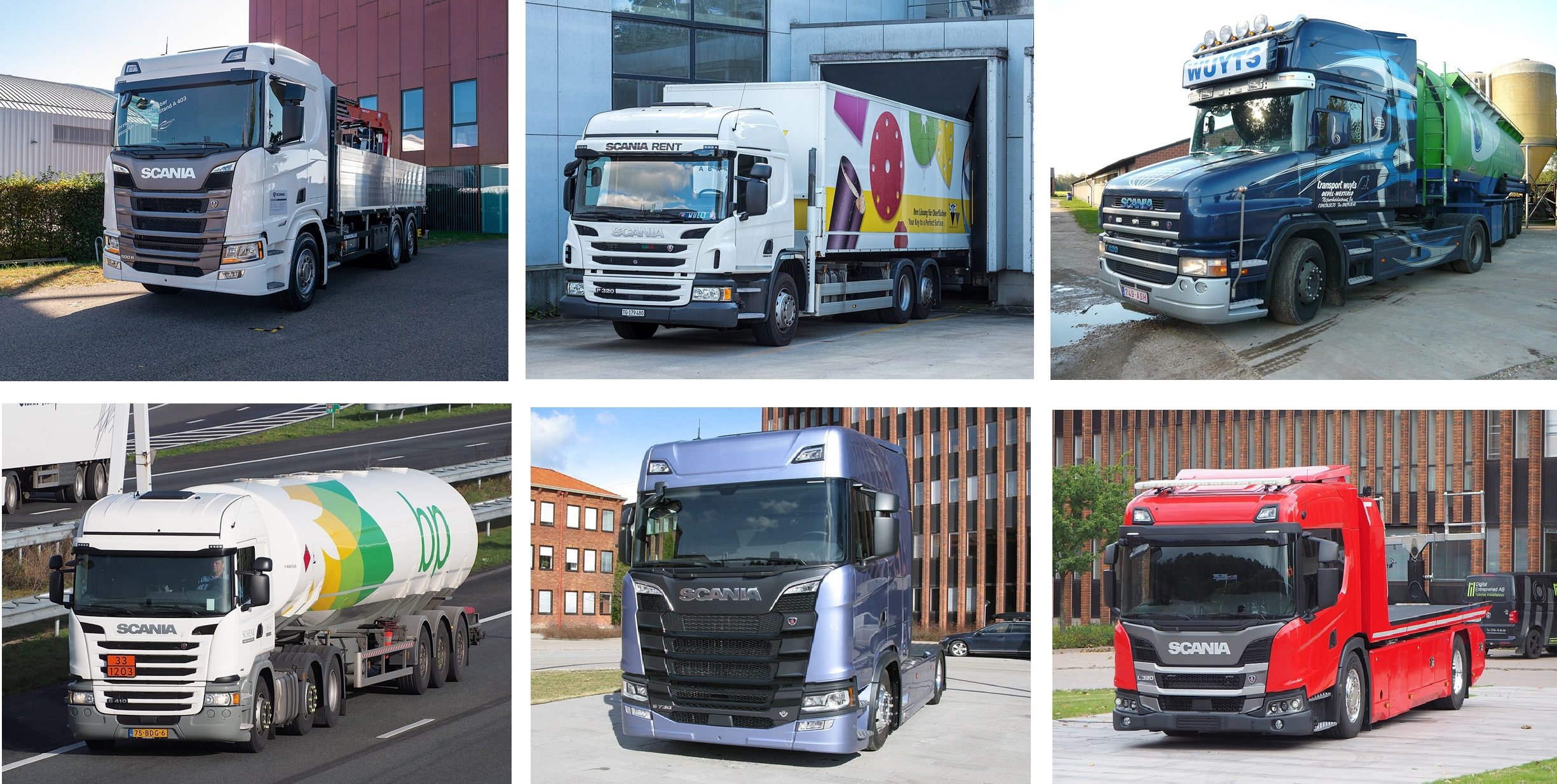
- Row 1: Scania R 500, P 320, and T 420. Row 2: Scania G 410, S 730, and L 320.

Overview
- Manufacturer: Scania
- Also called: Scania PRT-range; Scania PGRT-range
- Production: 2004–present
- Assembly: Sweden: Södertälje, Oskarshamn, Luleå (Scania AB); Netherlands: Zwolle (Scania Production Zwolle); France: Angers (Scania Production Angers SAS); Brazil: São Bernardo do Campo (Scania Latin America Ltda.); Russia: Saint Petersburg (MAN production plant); Malaysia: Kuala Lumpur (Scania (Malaysia) Sdn. Bhd.; CKD); India: Narsapura, Karnataka (Scania India; CKD); Philippines: San Simon, Pampanga (Scania PH San Simon Plant; CKD); Thailand: Samut Prakan (Scania Manufacturing (Thailand) Co., Ltd.; CKD)

Body and chassis
- Class: Commercial vehicle
- Body style: Forward control (L/P/G/R/S); Bonneted (T)

Powertrain
- Engine: 6.7 L DC07 I6; 8.9 L DC9 I5; 9.0 L DC09 Hybrid I5; 9.3 L DC09 I5; 10.6 L DC11 I6; 11.7 L DC12 I6; 12.7 L DC13 I6; 15.6 L DC16 V8; 16.4 L DC16 V8
- Electric motor: ~130 kW (177 PS; 174 hp) Permanent magnet electric machine with oil spray cooling (PHEV); ~230–295 kW (313–401 PS; 308–396 hp) Permanent magnet electric machine with oil spray cooling (BEV)
- Power output: 220-770 hp
- Transmission: Manual (standard for first gen); Scania Opticruise (standard for next gen); 14-Speed Scania GRS905 / GRSO905 Automatic (12+2 crawler gears)
- Hybrid drivetrain: DC-AC PHEV (PRT-range PHEV)
- Battery: 90 kWh Li-ion (PHEV); 165 / 300 / 728 kWh Li-ion (BEV)
- Plug-in charging: CCS2 375kW DC

Chronology
- Predecessor: Scania 4-series

The Scania PRT-range (also known as Scania LPGRS-range or Scania PGRT-range), also referred to as new truck range or Scania's truck range, is the current range of trucks produced by the Swedish commercial vehicle manufacturer Scania. It was first introduced as the successor to the 4-series on 31 March 2004 with the high forward control cab Scania R-series, followed by the low forward control cab Scania P-series and bonneted cab Scania T-series on 20 August 2004. The bonneted model was discontinued in October 2005. On 5 September 2007 the Scania G-series, a medium forward control cab was introduced and was derived from the R-series. The entire range is modular, giving a wide range of different configurations for different types of trucks. The trucks are available with engines ranging from a 9-litre I5 to a 16-litre V8, with the V8 only being available in the higher model. A second generation launched in August 2016, first was the Scania S-series being the first flat-floor model. In December 2017, a low-entry version of the second generation, the Scania L-series, also launched.

== First generation (2004–2017) ==
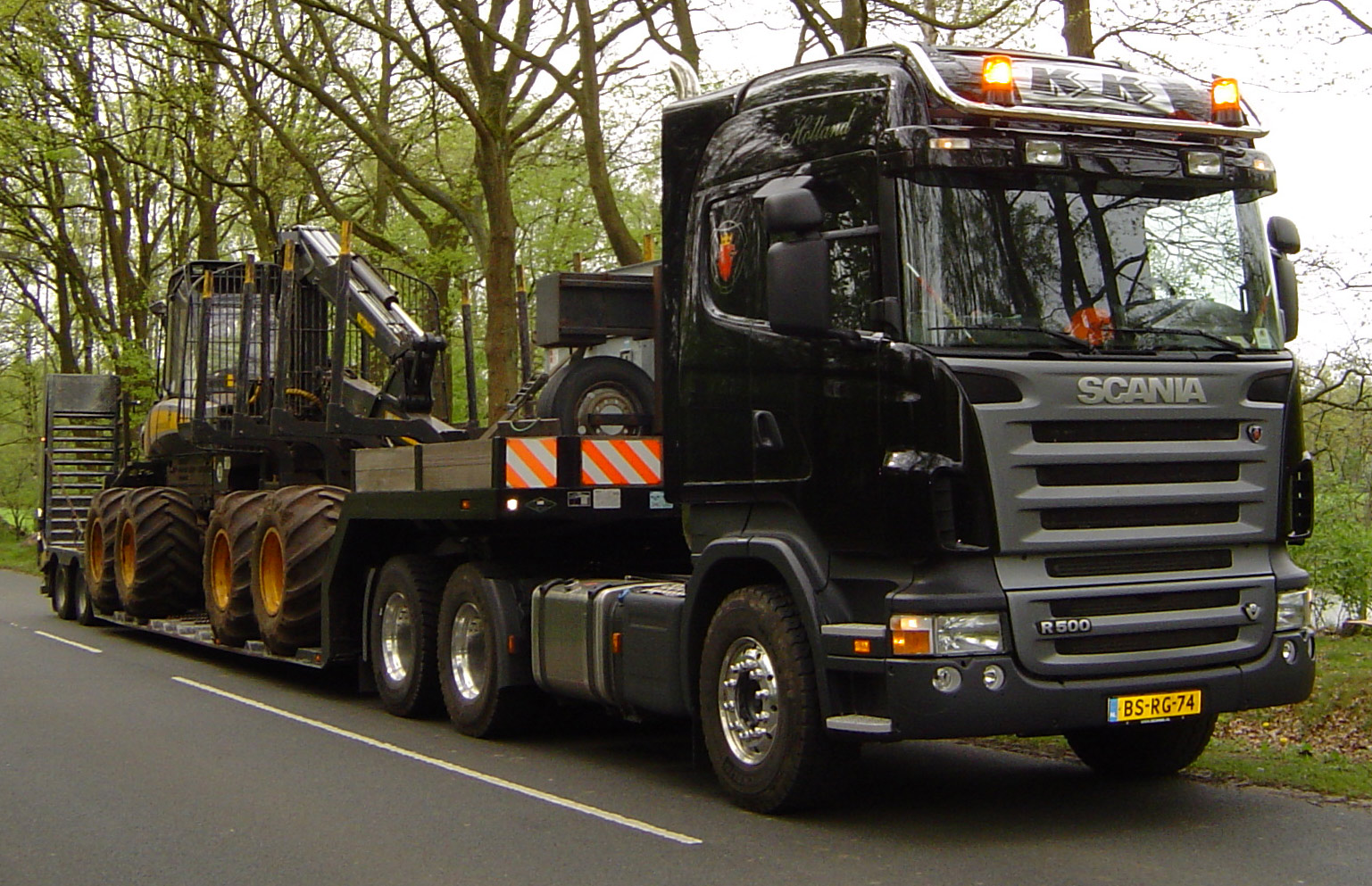
Scania R 500 LA6x2HHA tractor unit with pre-2009 styling in the Netherlands.

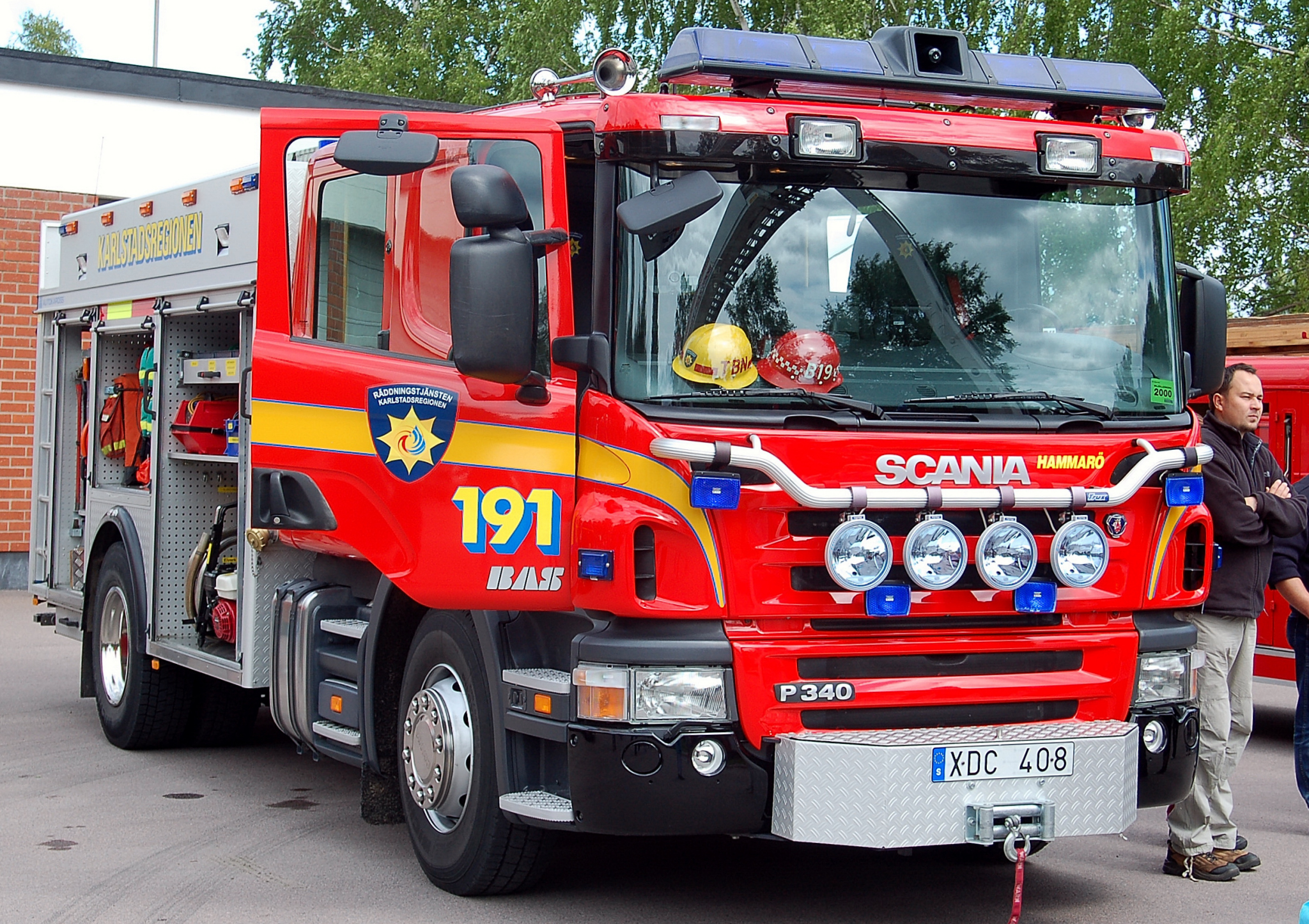
Scania P 340 LB4x2HHA fire engine in Hammarö, Sweden.

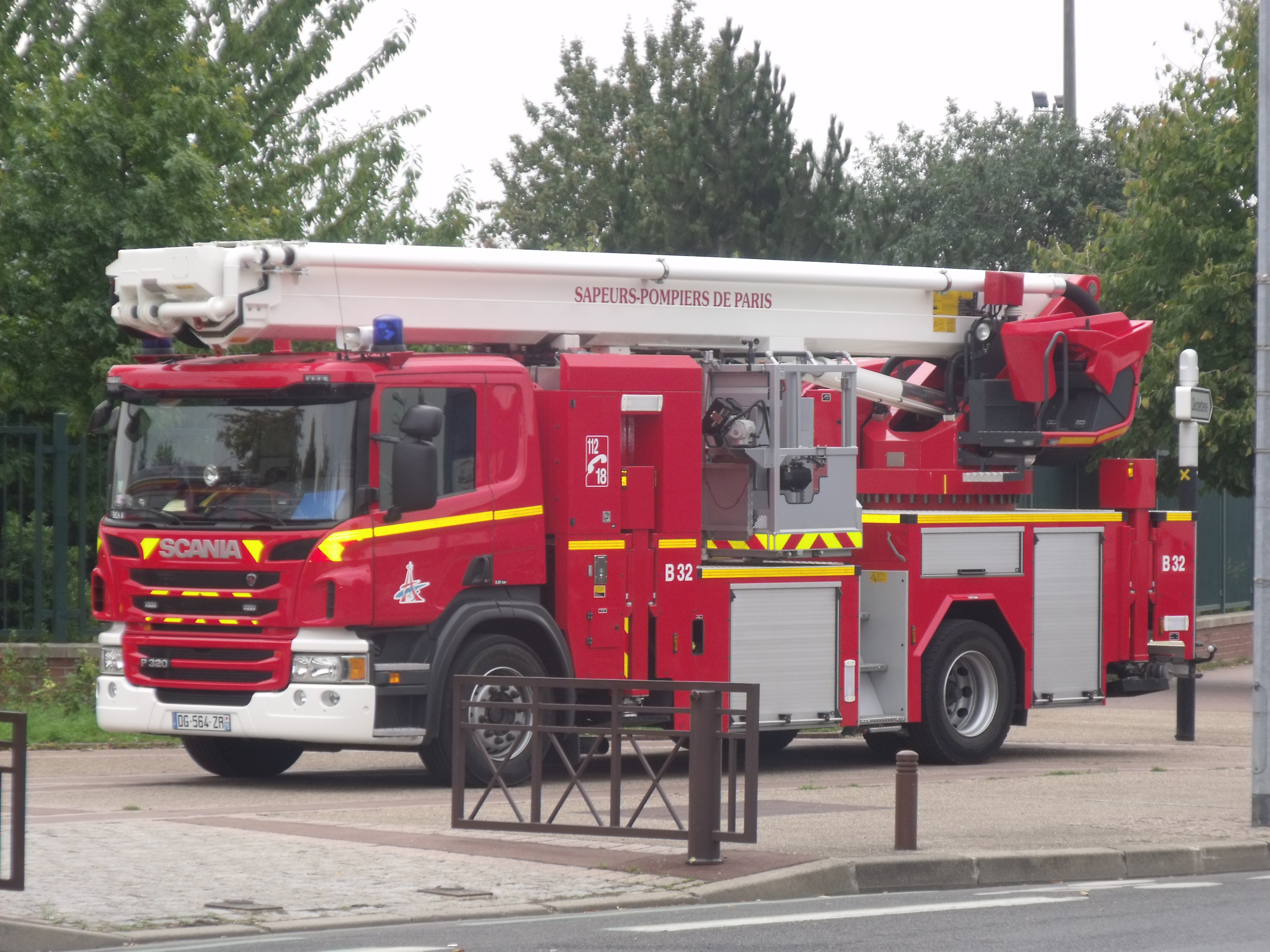
Scania P 320 of the Paris Fire Brigade.

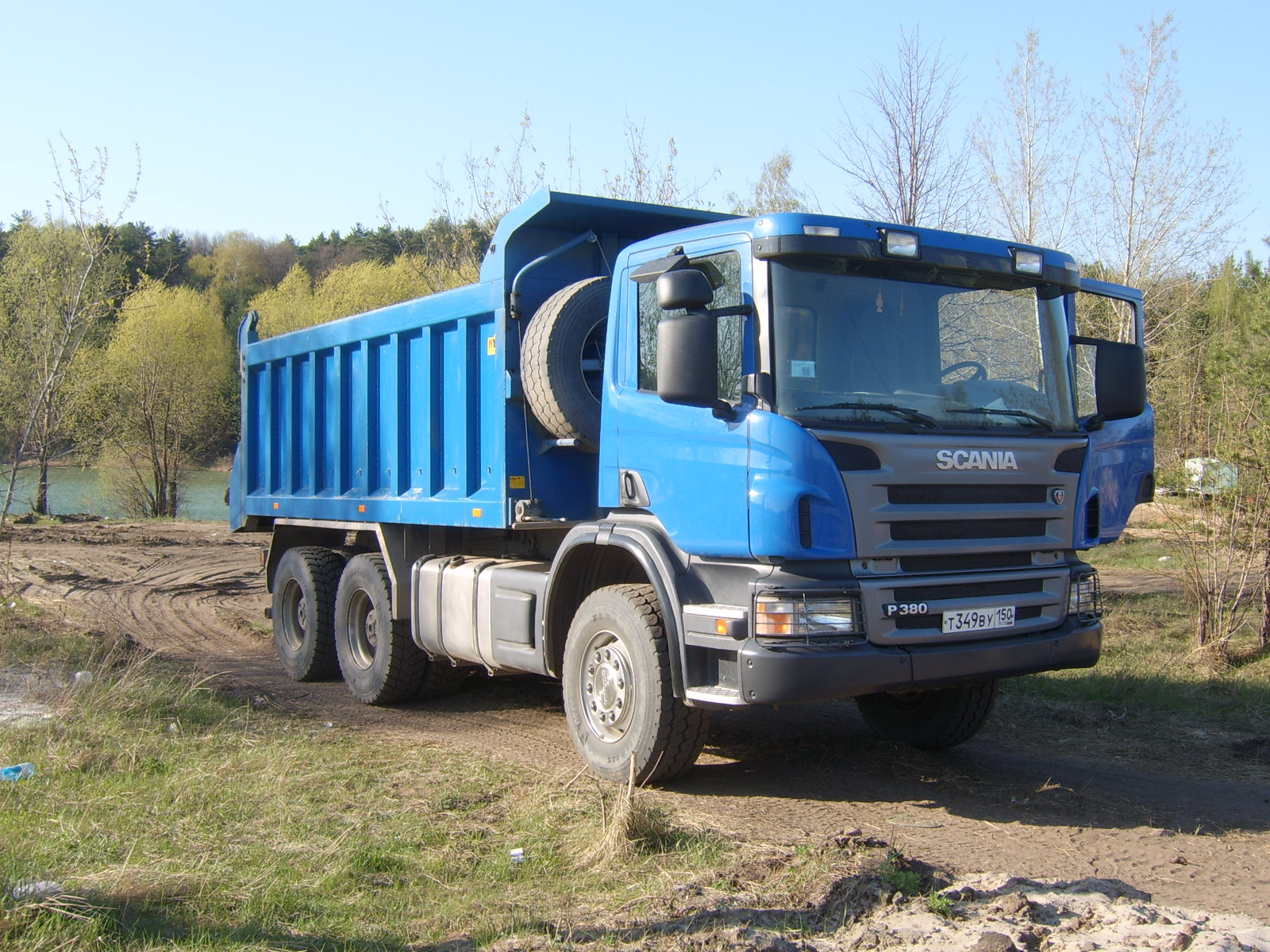
Scania P 380 tipper truck in Russia.

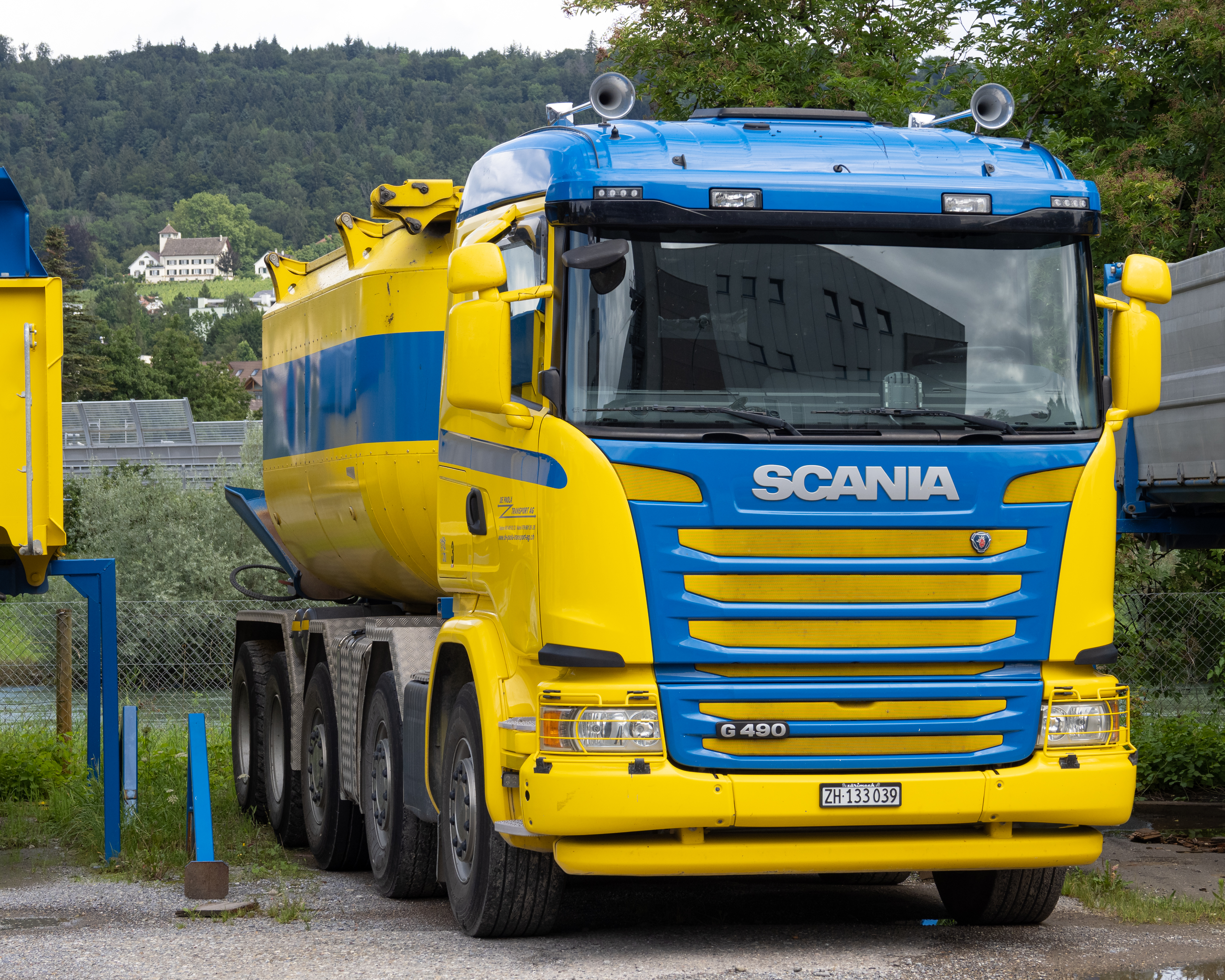
Scania G490 10x4

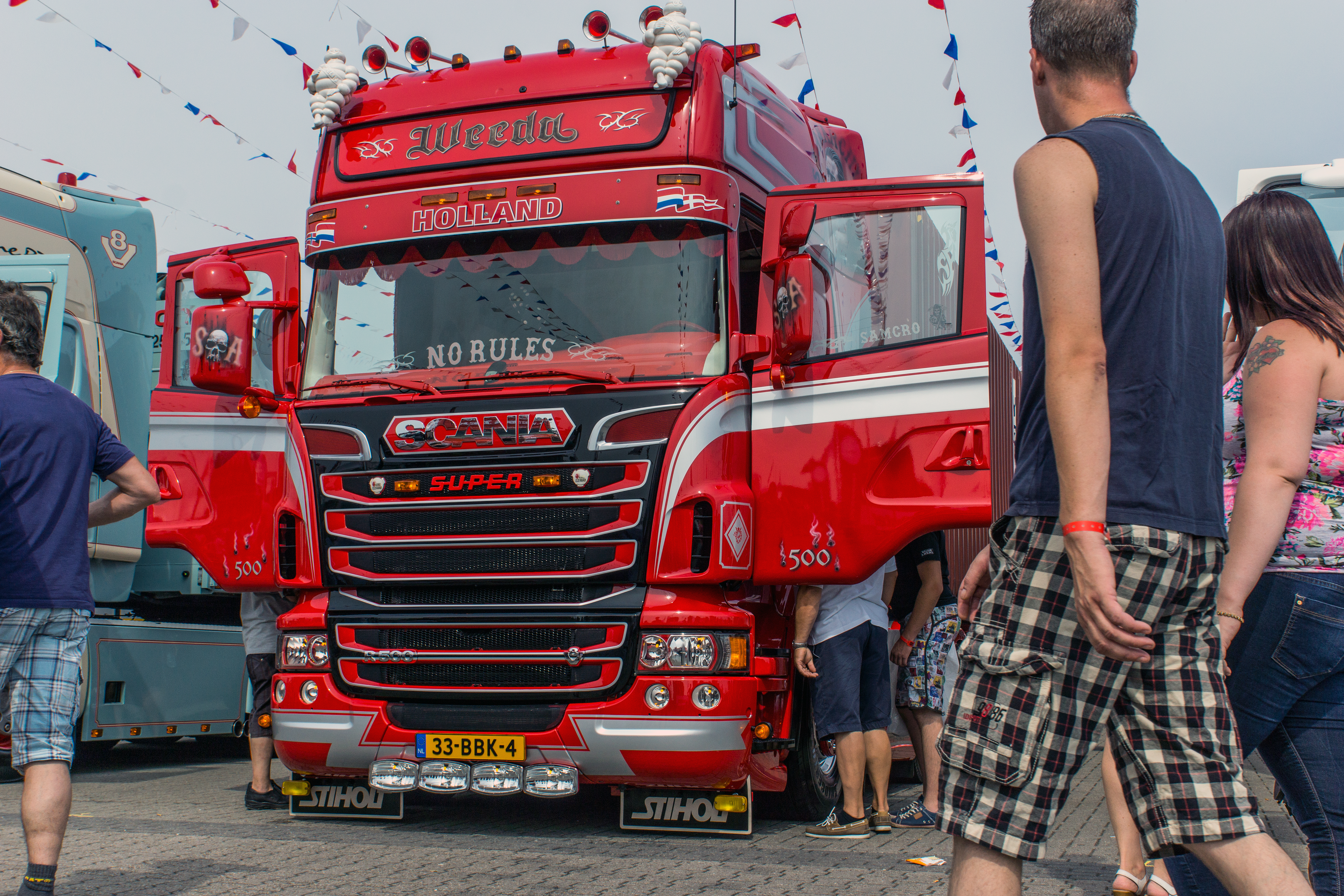
Custom painted Scania R 500 with 2009 facelift at the Truckstar Festival 2013 in Assen (NL).

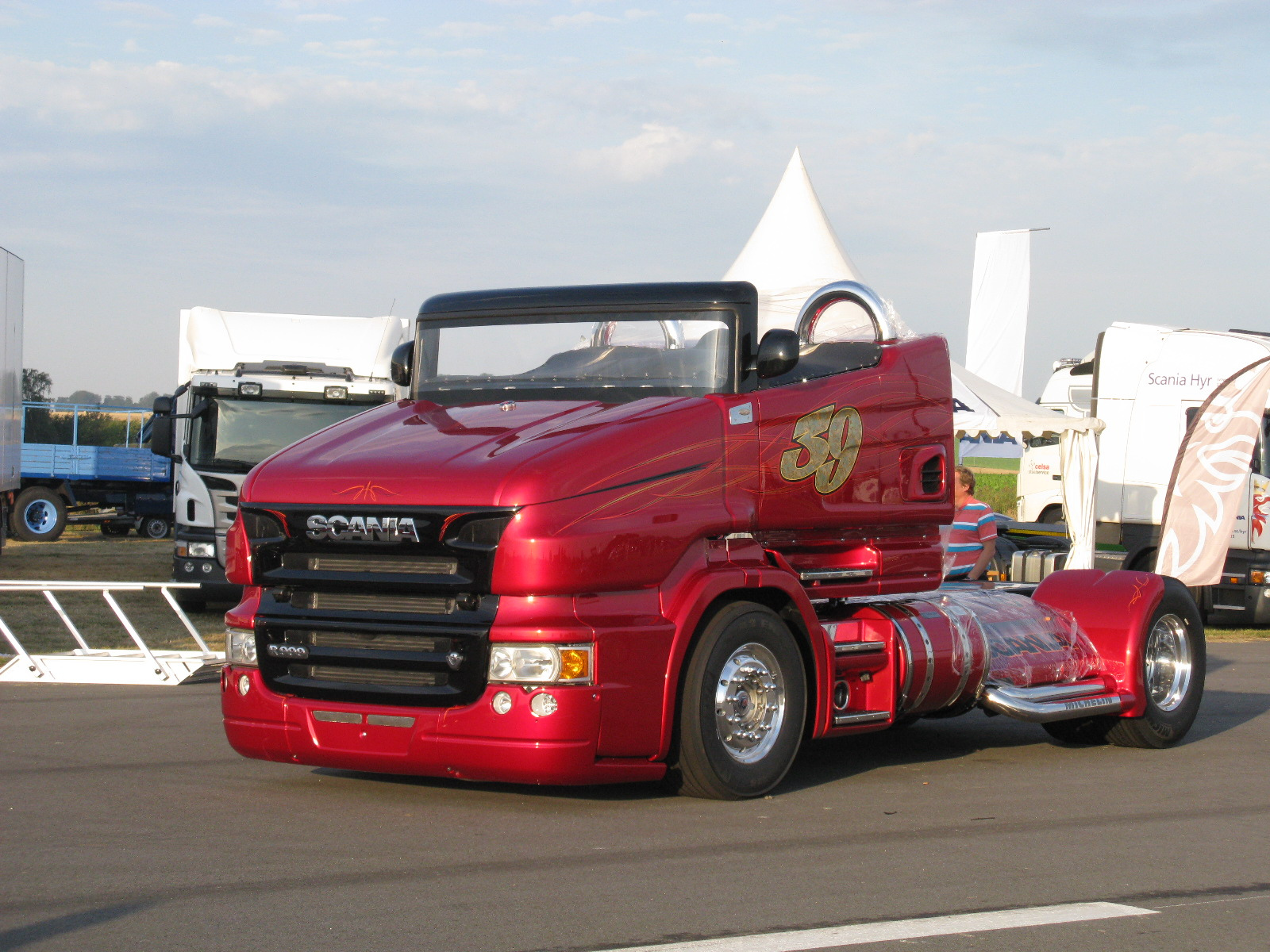
A former Scania T 500 test truck, converted by Sven-Erik "Svempa" Bergendahl into a roadster, fitted with a twin-turbo and named the R 999 "Red Pearl".

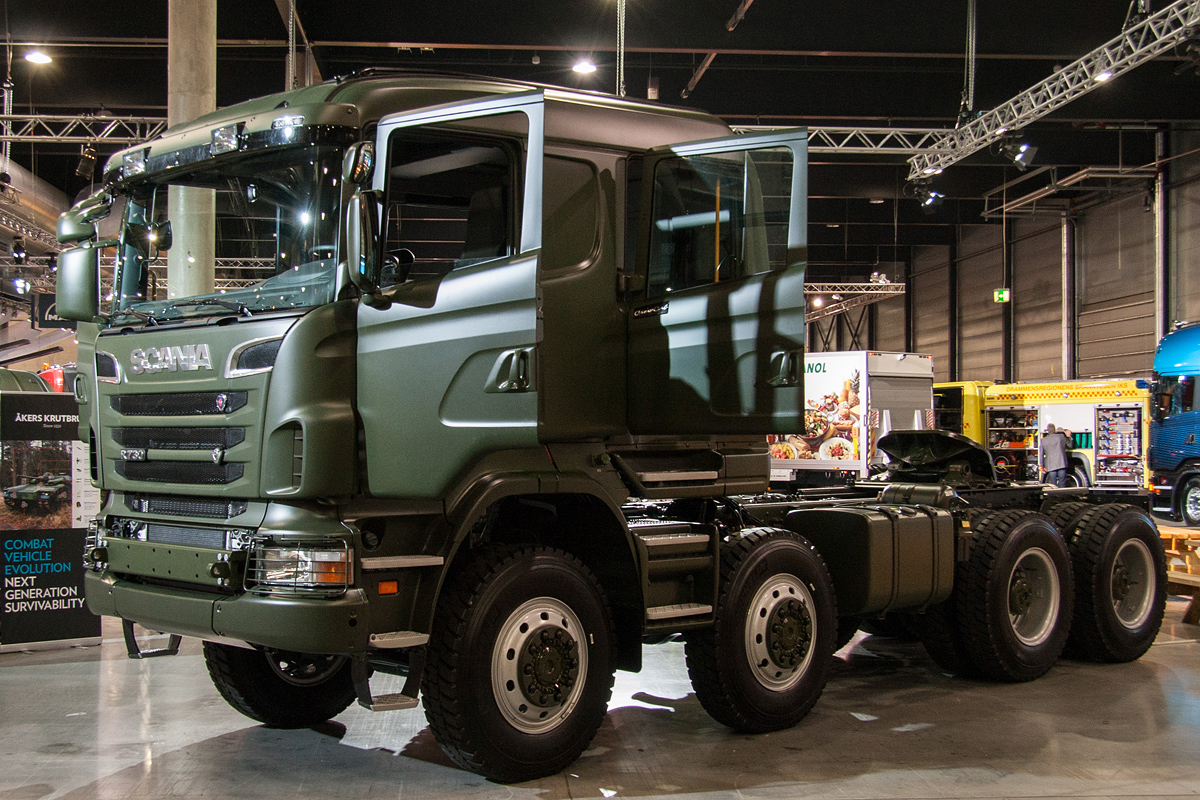
Scania R 730 CA8x8EHZ with CR31 CrewCab, eight-wheel drive heavy-haulage tractor at Norway Trade Fairs in Lillestrøm, Norway in 2011.

The range was first launched with the R-series on 31 March 2004, replacing the R94, R114, R124, R144, and R164 of the 4-series. It had 65 percent of the same components as its predecessors, but with a new cab design, new interior and other technical improvements. Full-scale production started in Södertälje (Sweden) in April, Zwolle (the Netherlands) in May and in Angers (France) in June. At launch it was available with Euro III engines, but with a 420 hp Euro IV engine available from September. On 20 August, the P- and T-series were launched too, completing the new truck range and replacing the rest of the 4-series models. The new models made their public debut at the IAA commercial vehicle show in Hanover in late September. Production of the 4-series was continued at the Scania Latin America plant in São Bernardo do Campo (Brazil), but was from October 2004 relaunched as the Série Evolução (Evolution Series), featuring the new engines of the PRT-range and the same new model designation, but with the old 4-series cabs.

In October 2005, Scania decided to discontinue the bonneted T-series, having lost its market share over the years. Over the last decade the sales had been halved in Europe and gone down 90 percent in Latin America. In 2004, fewer than 1,000 bonneted Scania trucks were sold worldwide, meaning there was no longer a market for it. In late 2006, Scania launched a new low-entry version of the P-series cab, known as the CP19E, specially intended for garbage trucks, where the driver needs to get in and out quickly. This cab was targeted as a competitor to the Mercedes-Benz Econic.

On 5 September 2007, Scania launched the all-new G-series, with a cab height between the P-series and the R-series. It should not be confused with the old G cab of the 2- and 3-series, which was even lower than the P cab, nor with the G chassis of the 4-series (i.e. 94G). On 9 October 2007, the new range was also launched in Latin America, featuring all three P-, G- and R-series from the start. In April 2008, Scania unveiled their first ethanol-powered (ED95) trucks, having manufactured ethanol-powered buses for nearly two decades.

On 17 September 2009, an upgraded R-series was launched with many new features including a sharper exterior styling with larger grille openings, new interior details including the possibility of a factory-installed coffeemaker, new version of the Scania Opticruise gear system with automatic clutch and a driver support system. The G-series received the upgrade shortly afterwards, and the P-series during 2011. In 2014 the front air filters G & R - Series were given a redesign

In April 2010, Scania launched a new version of its V8 engine, allowing a maximum output of 730 hp (537 kW) and 3,500 N⋅m (2,581 lb⋅ft) while preparing for the future Euro VI emission requirements. The new R 730 then became the most powerful large-scale production truck in the world, only to be surpassed by the Volvo FH16 750 (750 hp, 3550 N·m) in September 2011.

In March 2013, Scania launched the new Streamline versions for R-series and G-series, featuring engines complying with Euro 6 regulations and aerodynamic improvements for lower fuel consumption.

=== Special edition ===
==== Special Edition (Brazil) ====
The Special Edition was a special edition based on Scania's range of trucks for the South American market (especially in Brazil), commemorating the 60 years of Scania Brasil. Inspired by the Brazilian-built Scania 3-series T113 bonneted truck from 1991, the special edition R series features an emblematic blue-sky colour which a combination of pink, lilac and purple from the previous T113. There were two options for the special edition, the Classic package featuring xenon headlamps, refrigerator compartment, and the package which adds polished aluminium wheels, steering wheel and leather seats. Sales commenced in July 2017.

== Second generation/next gen (2016–present) ==
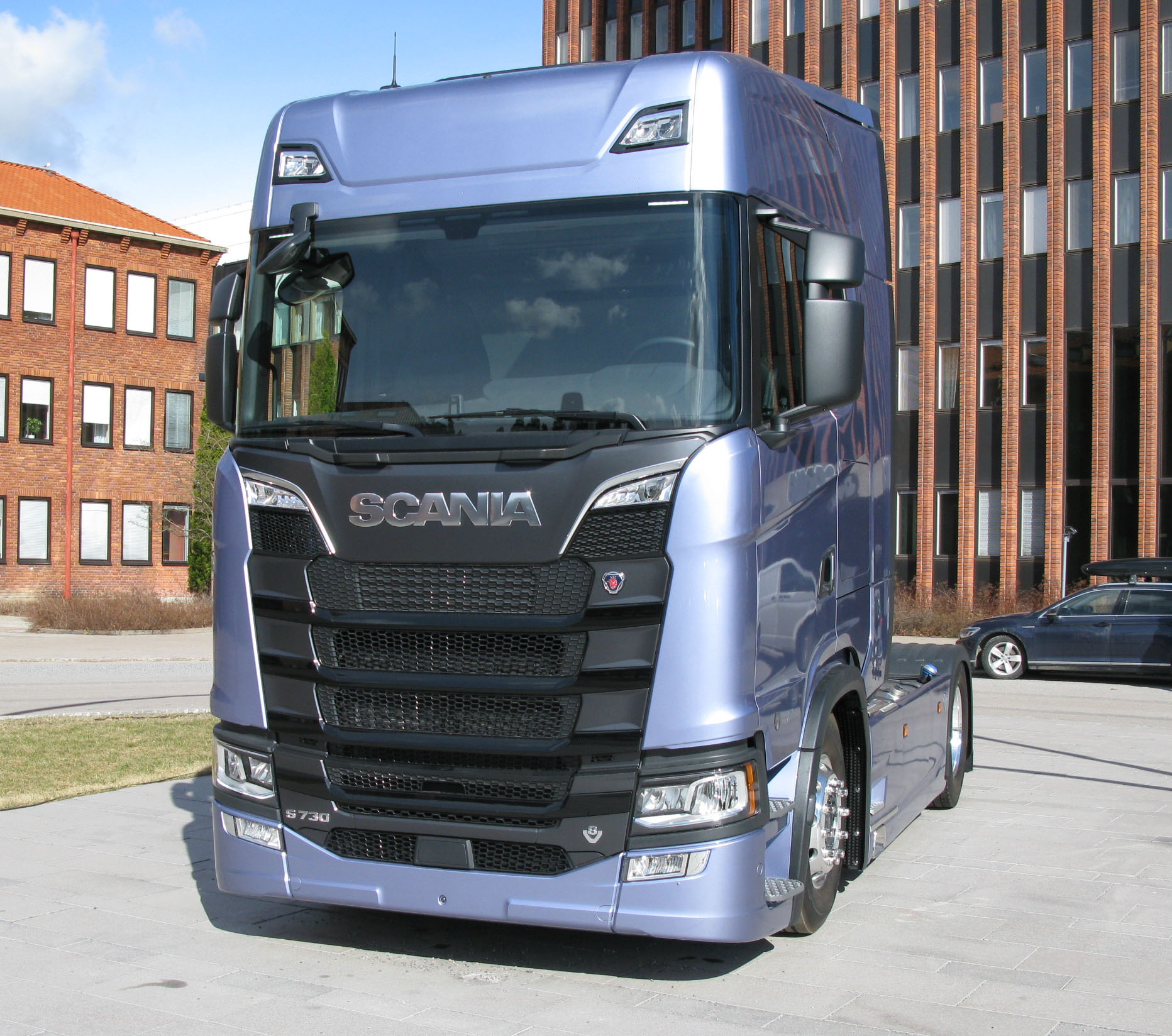
Second generation Scania S 730 in front of Scania's headquarter in Södertälje, Sweden.

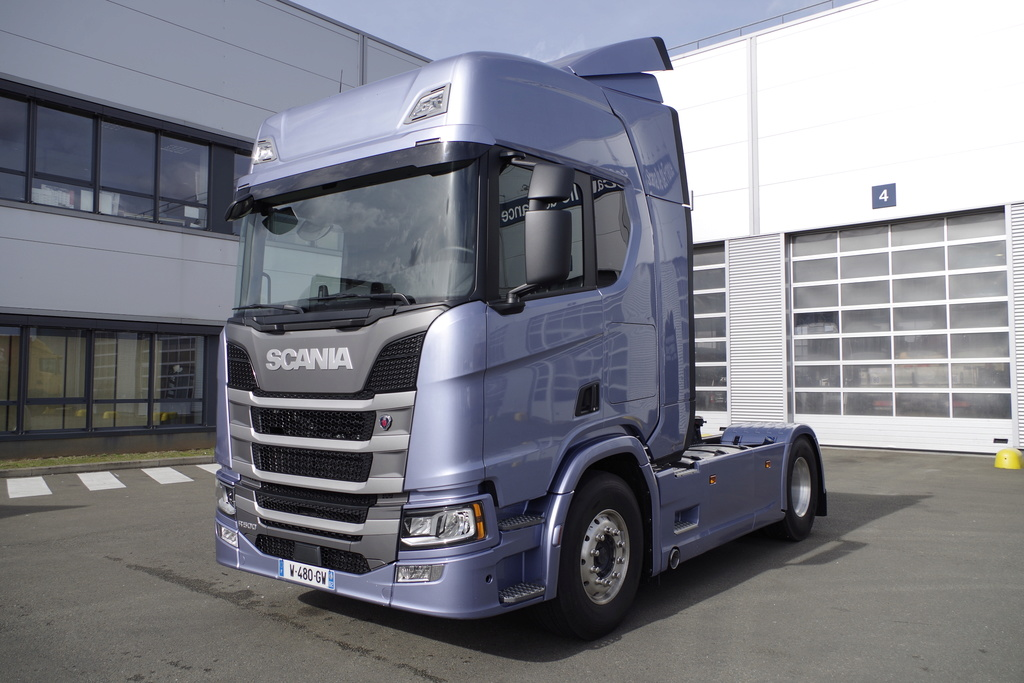
Second generation Scania R 500.

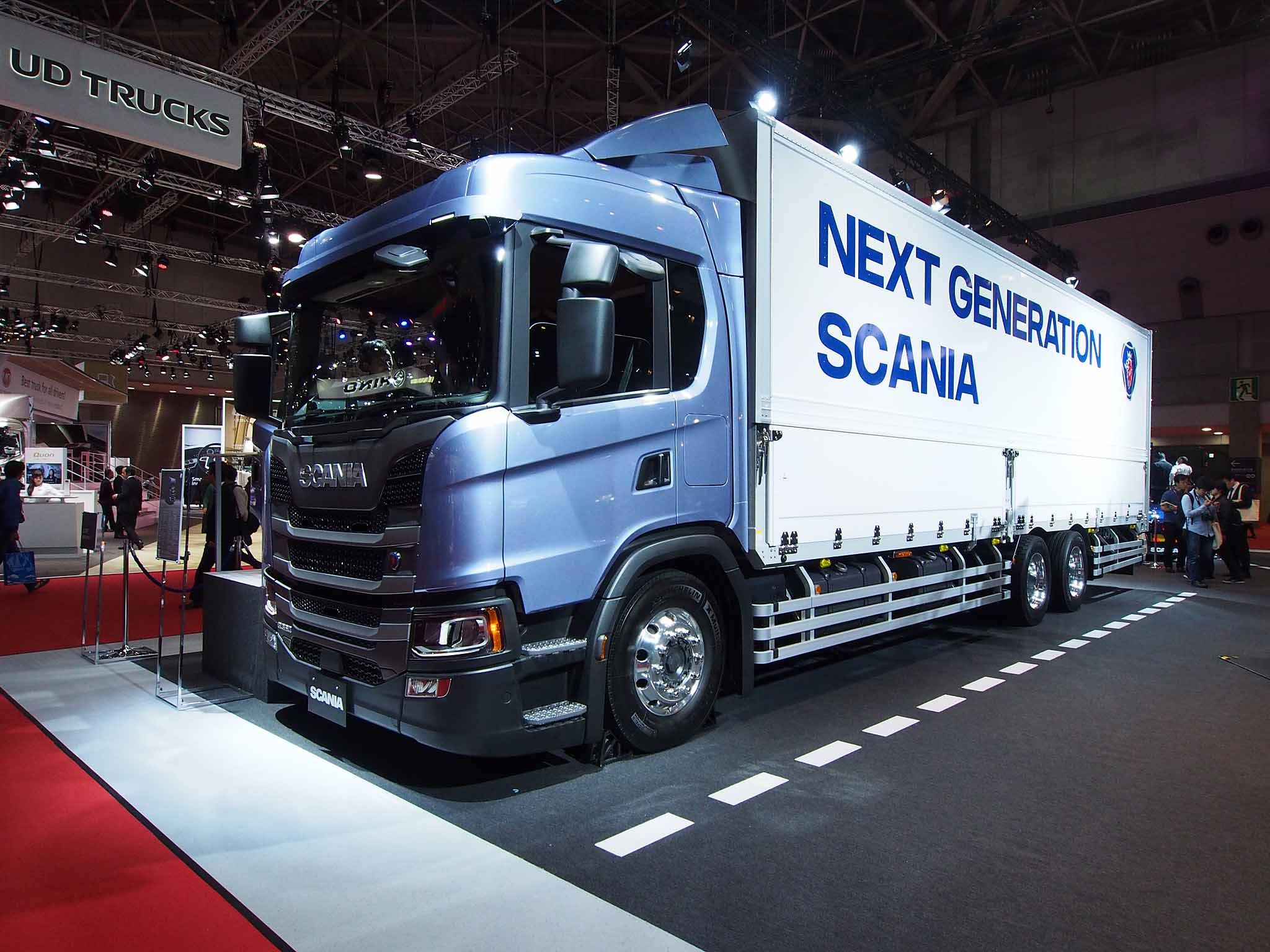
Second generation Scania G 360 at the 2017 Tokyo Motor Show in Tokyo, Japan.

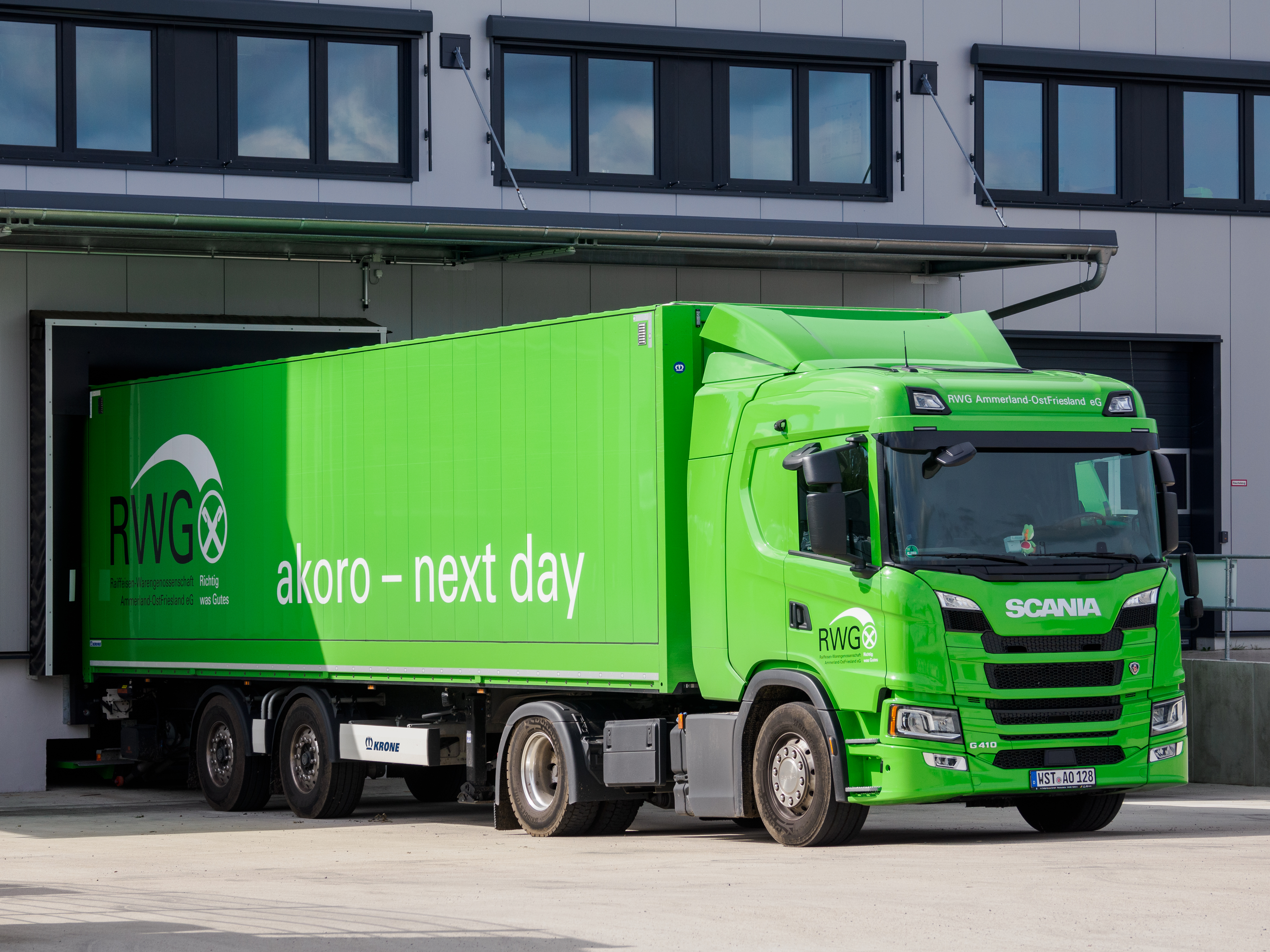
Scania G 410

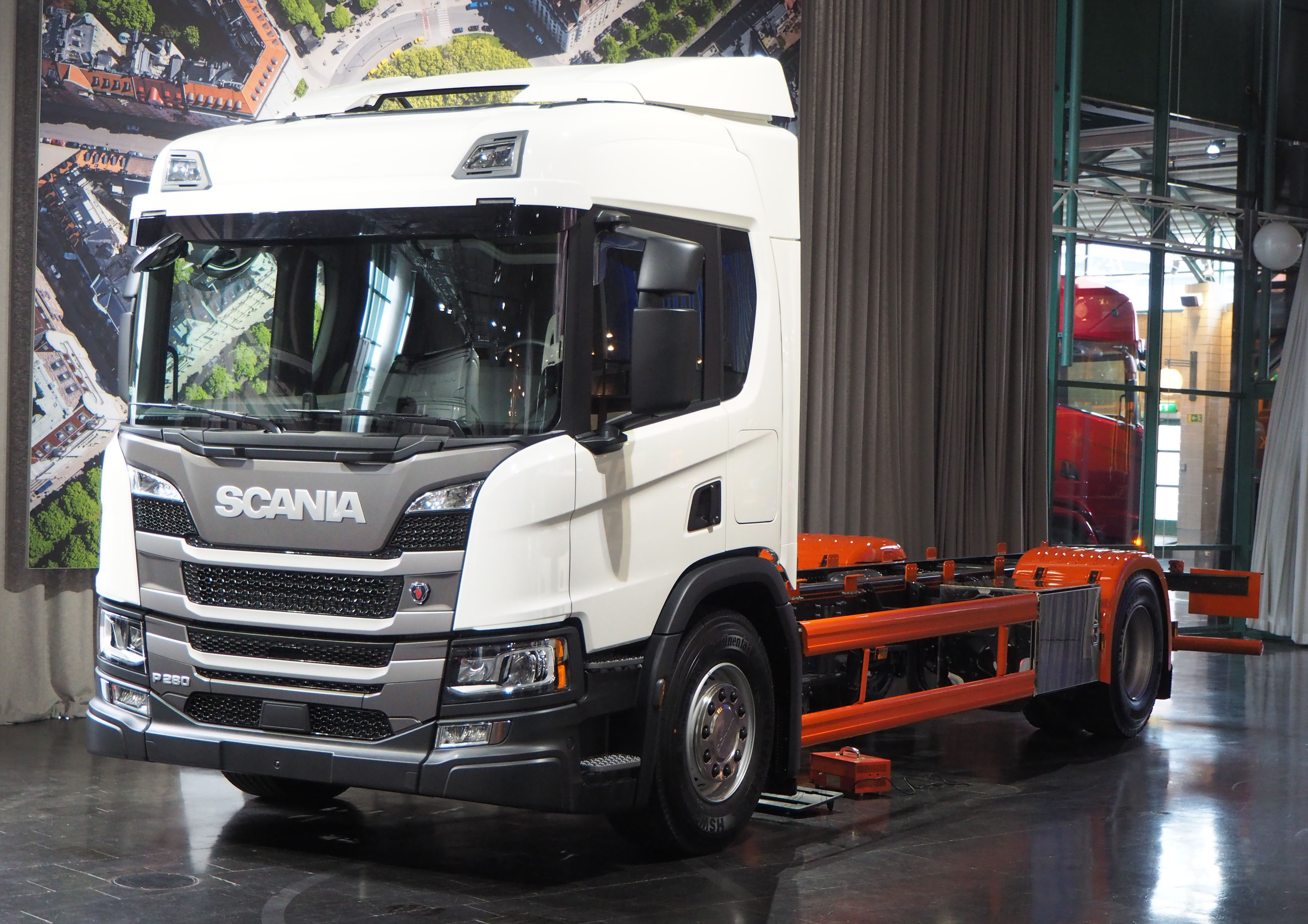
Second generation Scania P 280.

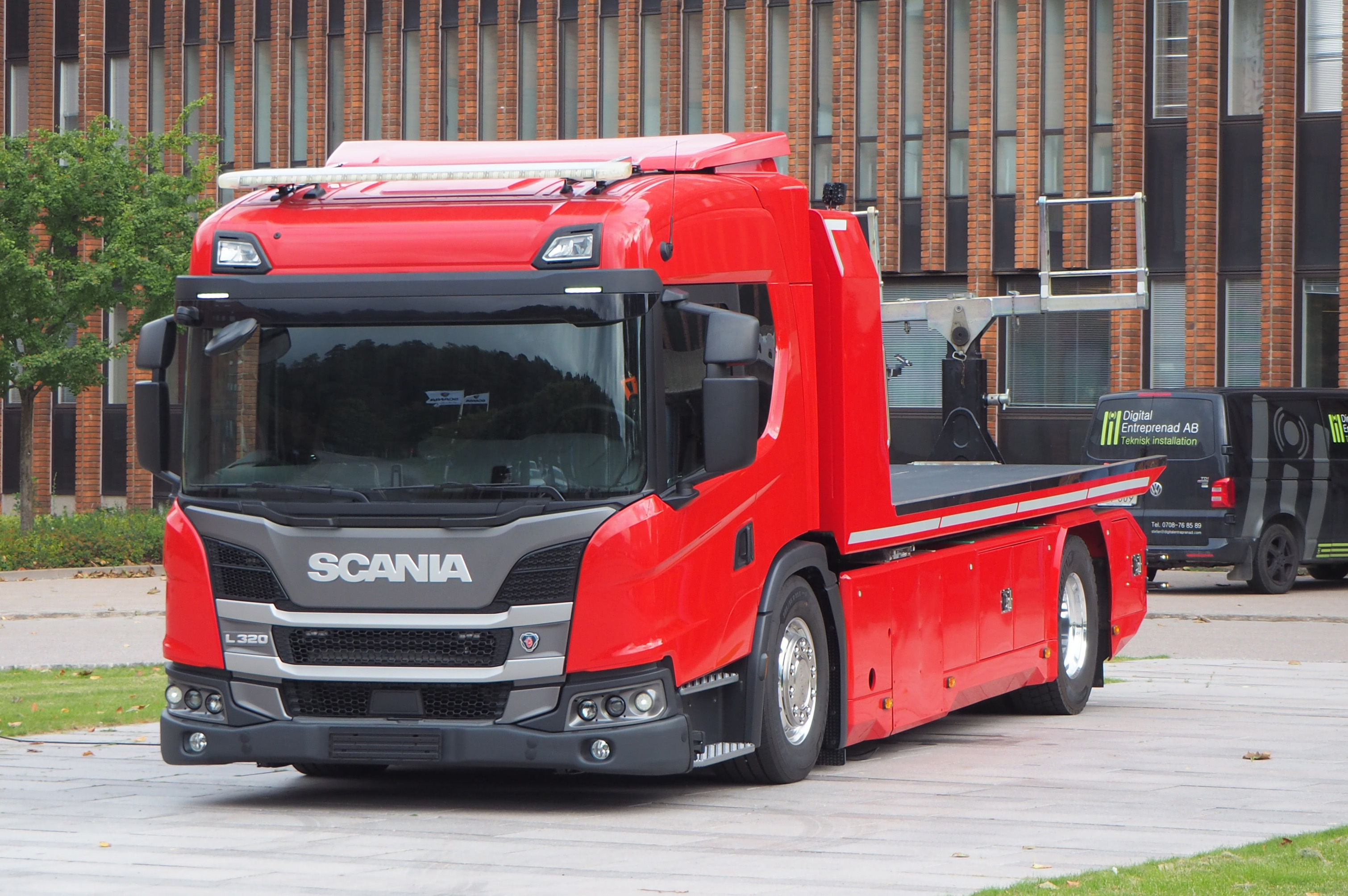
Second generation Scania L 320.

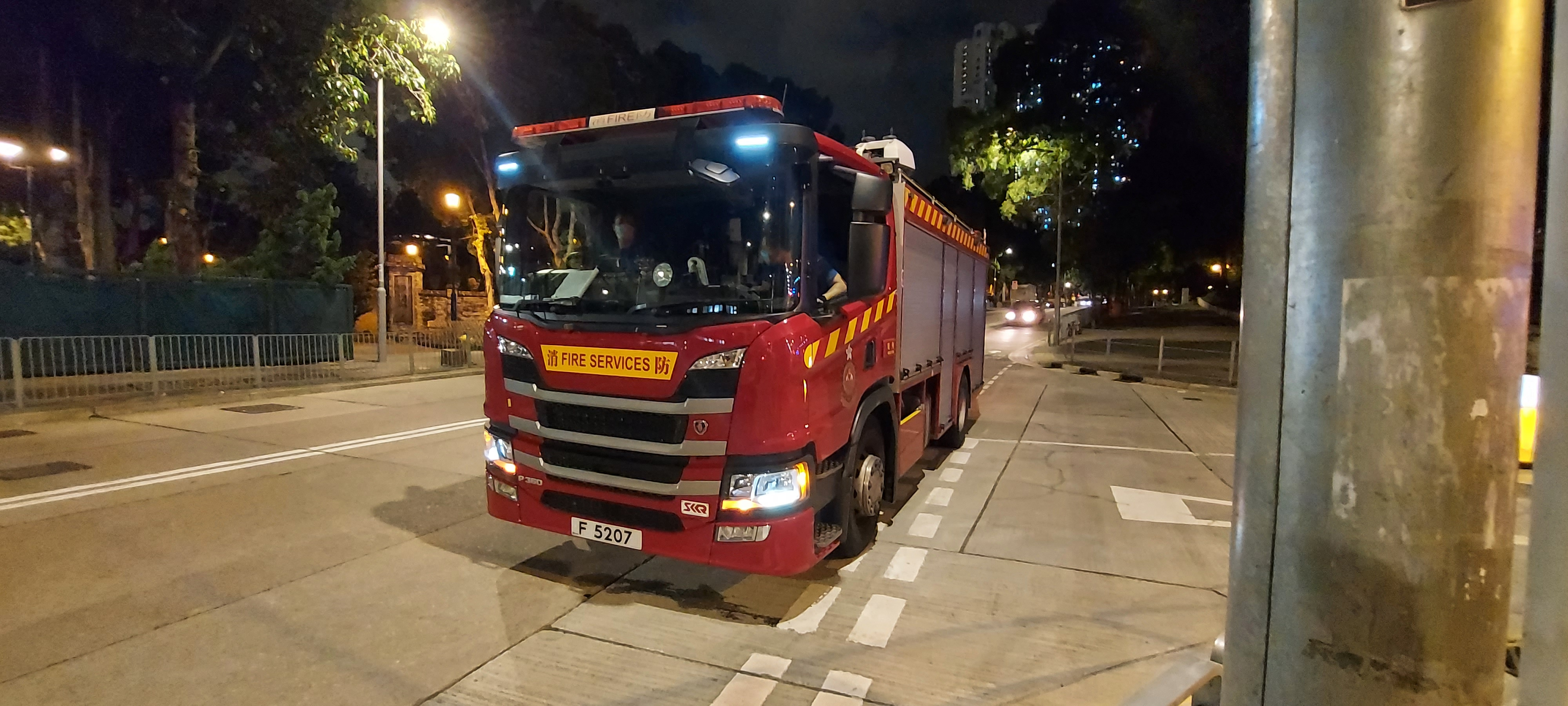
Second generation Scania P 360 fire engine of the Hong Kong Fire Services Department

Since Scania signed a deal with Porsche Engineering in August 2010, a completely new truck cab has been in development, known as a next generation. From early 2014, several masked prototypes have been spotted on roads in Sweden, Spain and Norway. It was officially launched at the Grand Palais in Paris on 23 August 2016. The launch included new R-series sleeper cab and the all-new S-series sleeper cab which offers a flat interior floor. Other cab heights, including R-series day cab, of the new generation will have a later launch. The first display of the new generation to a public audience occurred at the Elmia Lastbil fair in Jönköping, on 24 August. The second generation range features two touchscreen infotainment systems. The Base package has a 5-inch resolution, and the Premium package has a bigger, 7-inch resolution. In April 2017, the Premium package now supports for the first time – Apple CarPlay.

The low-entry version called the L series was added to the lineup in December 2017.

Plug-in Hybrid and Fully-electric models were introduced in 2020.

=== Scania XT ===
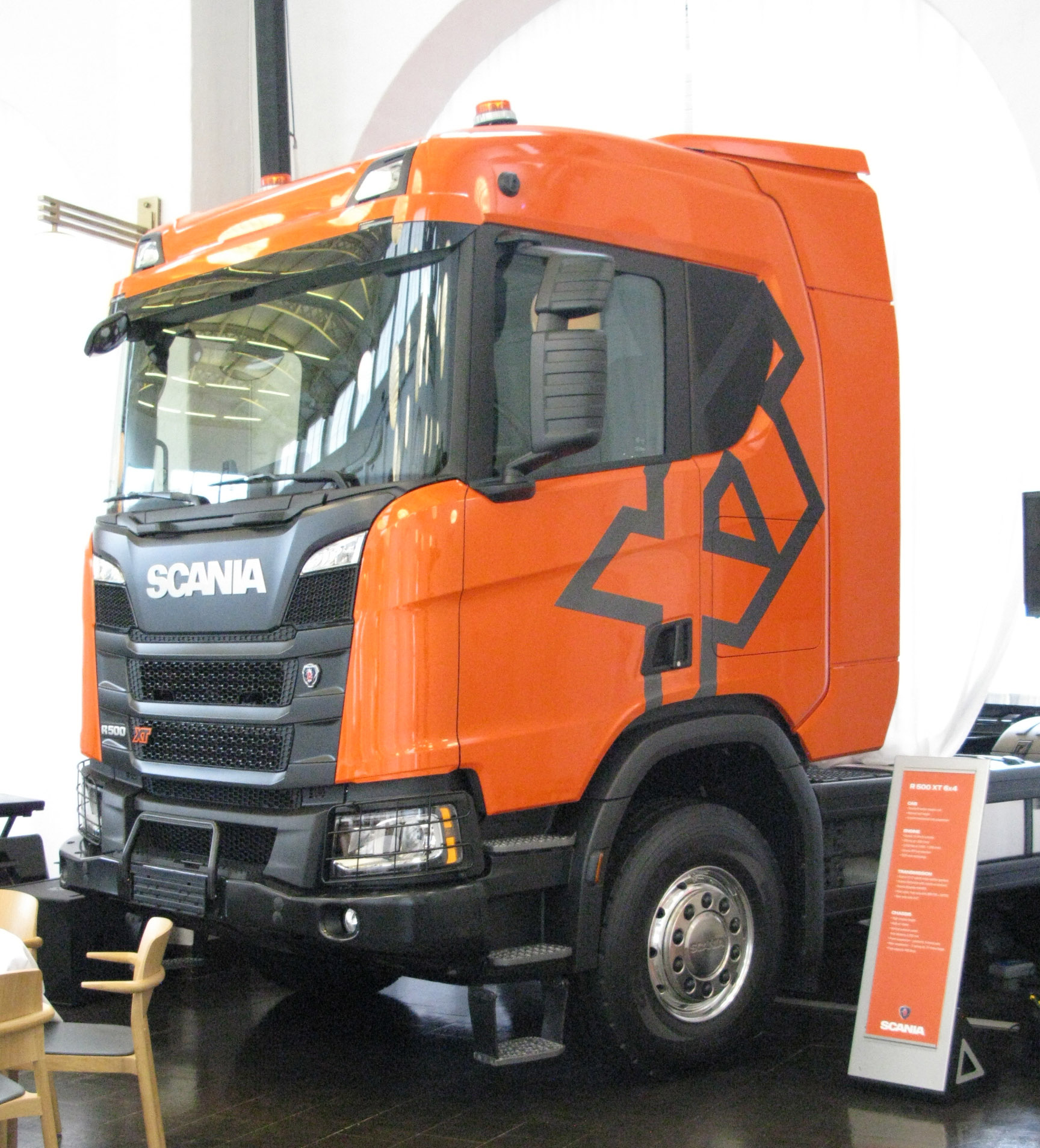
Scania R 500 XT

Introduced in September 2017, the Scania XT is sold in multiple configurations. Apart from its standard model, the XT features a steel bumper with which extended up to 150 millimetres, a protection shield, a towing device, high air intake and replaced standard side mirrors with reinforced ribbed rear view mirrors. It is certified for 40 tonnes, while enabling to pull other vehicles and equipment as well as to be towed when needed. Optional include an electronic braking system (EBS) with discs or drums, new two-leaf parabolic front springs and enlarged wheel housings to accommodate larger than normal wheel/tyre combinations, can be specified together with two different vertical exhaust stack options. The XT can also have touchscreen infotainment systems. Deliveries began in late 2017.

=== Scania Dynamic ===
On 14 September 2026, Scania revealed a new version of the both R and S range called "Scania Dynamic" with aerodynamic appearance, refreshed face with new lettering logo of "SCANIA", new door handles and new headlamps, with a camera based mirrors eventually taking place replaces traditional mirrors. On the next day, it also made its German public appearance took place in Hanover at the IAA Commercial Vehicle Show.

=== Special edition ===
- The 1969–2019 V8 was a celebratory limited edition based on the R-series and S-series, commemorating the 50th anniversary of the 1969 introduction of Scania's original V8 engine. It was revealed in the UK in September 2019; with only 25 units of the right-hand-drive were made available there. In addition to the existing V8-powered 520-730 models which come as basic standard equipment, a range of unique features includes a distinctive livery in a choice of three anniversary colours to choose from: Ruby Red, Arctic Silver, and Sapphire Blue, "1969–2019 V8" anniversary logos on the rear mudflaps and wheel hubs, and exclusive puddle lamps. Other external features include chrome trim grille air intakes, side windows and door handles and a rectangular left-side exhaust pipe design. Additional luxury fitments in the 1969–2019 V8 edition include embossed leather seats with exclusive red V8 stitching, a microwave oven, coffee machine, and an optional 7-inch premium touchscreen infotainment system. Deliveries commenced in November 2019.
- The 2021 Scania R410 A6X2NA Yak Edition was a celebratory limited edition based on the R-series, apart from Scania Siam’s 35th Anniversary in 2021. The design features of this limited edition: a distinctive Yak Edition decal placed above the cab, while it will remain is unchanged for the Thai market.
- The Collector’s Edition was a celebratory limited edition based on the R series and S series, commemorating the ending of Euro 5 emission compliant in Brazil. It was announced in December 2022. It features a gold details on the vehicle's front grille and on the sides (highlighting a large number 5 alluding to Euro 5 and in three that resemble a wing). It’s only available in Blue Ocean color, and it comes with either R 450 6x2 or 540 S 6x4, depending on both.

=== Engines ===
Diesel engine versions of the new generation currently available in selected truck models as of 2019. A liquefied natural gas (LNG) was added into the lineup in late 2017, alongside a compressed natural gas (CNG) version.

Diesel engines
Engine [Model]	Production [Year]	Displacement	Cylinder
DC07	2017-	6,692 cc (408.4 cu in)	I6
DC09	2017-	9,291 cc (567.0 cu in)	I5
DC13	2016-	12,742 cc (777.6 cu in)	I6
DC16	2016-	16,353 cc (997.9 cu in)	V8

=== Hybrid / Electric ===
Based on the P-series and L-series of urban trucks, Scania adopted an electrification technology which was announced in September 2020.

Hybrid: is a plug-in hybrid version combines the DC09 straight-5 diesel engine, supported by a single electric motor can run on HVO, biodiesel/FAME or diesel which makes 176 PS (129 kW; 174 hp) and 107.1 kg⋅m (1,050 N⋅m; 775 lb⋅ft).

Electric: is a battery-electric version uses a single motor which is capable a combined output of 310 PS (228 kW; 306 hp) and 224.3 kg⋅m (2,200 N⋅m; 1,622 lb⋅ft). Customers can also opt for either select five or nine batteries. The "25P" and "25L" (both, hence the name) for up to 250 kilometres (155 miles) using a single charge.

=== Safety ===
Euro NCAP test results Scania R-series 4x2 Tractor Unit (2024)
Test	Score
Overall:	3 /5 stars
Safe driving	64%
Crash avoidance	62%
Post crash	80%

Euro NCAP test results Scania G-series 4x2 Tractor Unit (2024)
Test	Score
Overall:	4 /5 stars
Safe driving	71%
Crash avoidance	62%
Post crash	80%

Euro NCAP test results Scania R-series 6x2 Rigid (2025)
Test	Score
Overall:	4 /5 stars
Safe driving	67%
Crash avoidance	63%
Post crash	80%

Euro NCAP test results Scania R-series 4x2 Tractor Unit (2025)
Test	Score
Overall:	4 /5 stars
Safe driving	67%
Crash avoidance	63%
Post crash	80%

Euro NCAP test results Scania G-series 6x2 Rigid (2025)
Test	Score
Overall:	4 /5 stars
Safe driving	71%
Crash avoidance	62%
Post crash	80%

Euro NCAP test results Scania L-series 6x2 Rigid (2026)
Test	Score
Overall:	5 /5 stars
Safe driving	87%
Crash avoidance	92%
Post crash	80%

Euro NCAP test results Scania P-series 4x2 Rigid (2026)
Test	Score
Overall:	5 /5 stars
Safe driving	81%
Crash avoidance	93%
Post crash	80%

Euro NCAP test results Scania L-series 4x2 Rigid (2026)
Test	Score
Overall:	5 /5 stars
Safe driving	86%
Crash avoidance	93%
Post crash	80%

Euro NCAP test results Scania P-series 6x2 Rigid (2026)
Test	Score
Overall:	5 /5 stars
Safe driving	81%
Crash avoidance	92%
Post crash	80%

Euro NCAP test results Scania R-series 6x2 Rigid (2026)
Test	Score
Overall:	5 /5 stars
Safe driving	76%
Crash avoidance	96%
Post crash	80%

Euro NCAP test results Scania R-series 4x2 Tractor Unit (2026)
Test	Score
Overall:	5 /5 stars
Safe driving	76%
Crash avoidance	96%
Post crash	80%

Euro NCAP test results Scania G-series 6x2 Rigid (2026)
Test	Score
Overall:	5 /5 stars
Safe driving	82%
Crash avoidance	96%
Post crash	80%

Euro NCAP test results Scania G-series 4x2 Tractor Unit (2026)
Test	Score
Overall:	5 /5 stars
Safe driving	82%
Crash avoidance	96%
Post crash	80%

== Model designation ==
Scania use different model designations for different contexts. A simplified truck model designation is used for marketing and is visible in the grille. Another complete designation defines the characteristics of the chassis and the drivetrain, and a third designation defines the cab configuration.

=== Truck model ===
The simplified truck model name consists of the cab type and horsepower, divided by a space. Examples: R 730, G 440, P 270.

=== Complete vehicle ===
Cab type

- L: Lowest forward control cab
- P: Low forward control cab & crew cab
- G: Medium forward control cab
- R: High forward control cab
- S: Highest forward control cab with flat floor
- T: Bonneted cab (2004-2005 Scania, 2008-present Vlastuin, Tuft)

Power code

Approximation of the power rating in hp to the nearest ten. The power code has spaces on both sides.

Type of transport

- L: Long-distance haulage
- D: Distribution
- C: Construction

Chassis adaption

- A: Tractor unit (Articulated)
- B: Truck bodywork (Basic)

Wheel configuration

- 4x2: two-axle
- 4x4: two-axle, all-wheel drive
- 6x2: tri-axle, rigid tag axle
- 6x2/2: tri-axle, rigid pusher axle
- 6x2/4: tri-axle, steered pusher axle
- 6x2*4: tri-axle, steered tag axle
- 6x4: tri-axle, double drive axle
- 6x6: tri-axle, all-wheel drive
- 8x2: four-axle, double front axle, rigid tag axle
- 8x2/4: four-axle, steered pusher axle, rigid tag axle
- 8x2*6: four-axle, double front axle, steered tag axle
- 8x4: four-axle, double front axle, double drive axle
- 8x4*4: four-axle, double drive axle, steered tag axle
- 8x8: four-axle, all-wheel drive

Duty class

- M: Medium duty, for transport on even surfaces
- H: Heavy duty, for transport on uneven surfaces
- E: Extra heavy duty, for off-road transport

Chassis height

- E: Extra low
- L: Low
- N: Normal
- S: Semi high
- H: High

Suspension

- A: leaf-spring suspension front and air suspension rear
- B: air suspension front and rear
- Z: leaf-spring suspension front and rear

Examples:

- P 230 DB4x2MNA: Low forward control cab, 230 hp, distribution truck
- R 730 CA8x8EHZ: High forward control cab, 730 hp, four-axle all-wheel drive, off-road tractor unit
- S 500 LA6x4HNB: High, flat-floor control cab, 500 hp, tri-axle RWD for two axles, long-distance transport unit

=== Cab ===
Cab type

The cab type consists of C and the corresponding letter for the main cab type; CP, CG, CR and CT.

Cab length

Interior distance between front and rear walls, measured in decimetres.

- 14: Short cab
- 16: Day cab
- 19: Sleeper cab
- 28: CrewCab (5−6 persons)
- 31: Long CrewCab (6−8 persons)
- 32: Extended sleeper cab

Roof height

- N: Normal
- L: Low
- E: Low boarding step, normal roof height (Low entry)
- H: High (Scania Highline)
- T: Full height (Scania Topline)

Examples:

- CP19E: Low entry cab, for garbage trucks
- CP31: Long crew cab, for fire engines
- CR19H: High-entry sleeper cab, for long-distance haulage trucks
