= Scania 3-series =

Scania Three-Series
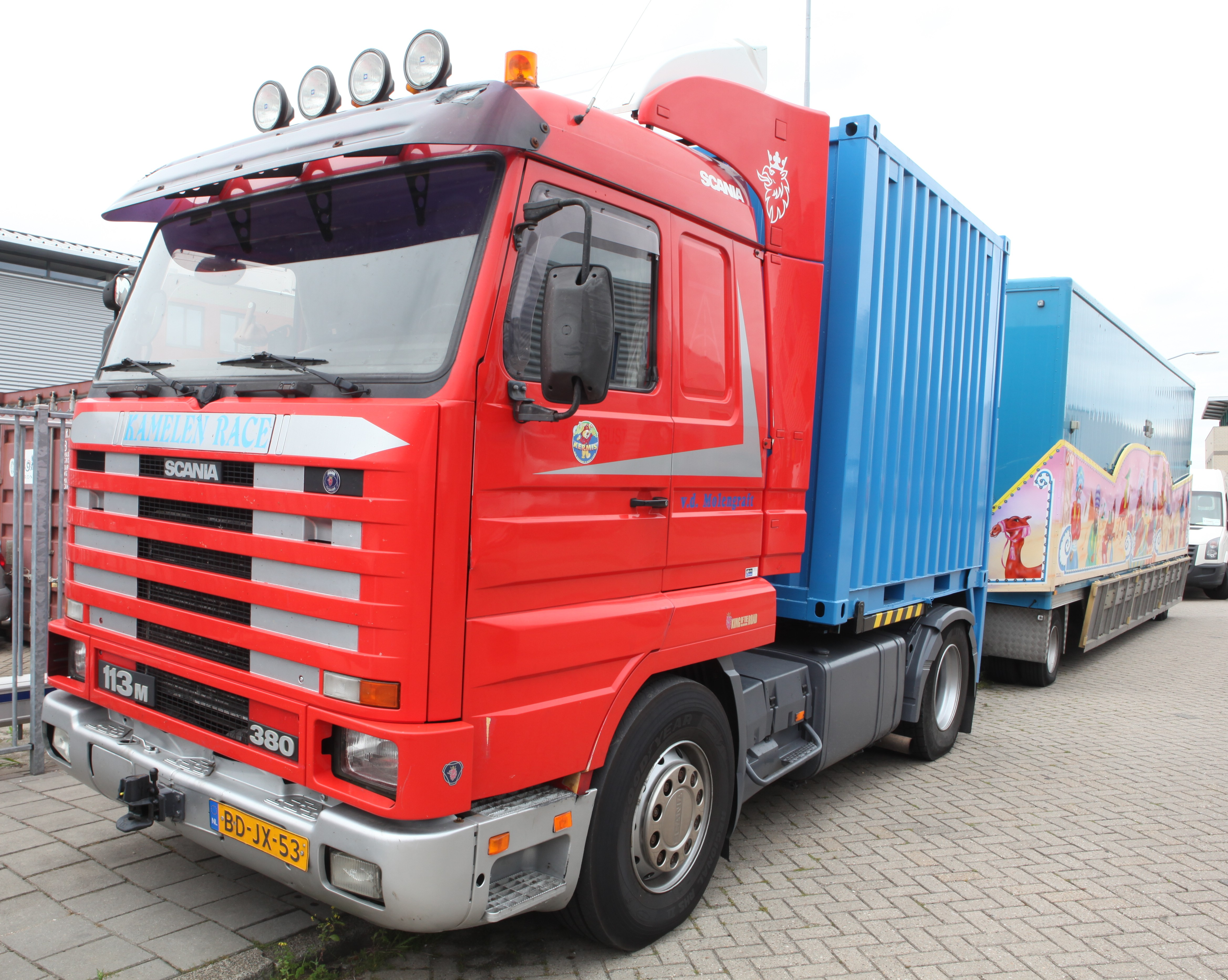

Overview
- Manufacturer: Scania
- Production: 1987–1998
- Assembly: Södertälje, Sweden (Scania AB)

Body and chassis
- Class: Heavy truck
- Body style: COE, Conventional: Day cab; Streamline
- Layout: “4
- Platform: Scania DC Platform

Powertrain
- Engine: Scania G, P, R, T 93 (DS9, DSC9); Scania P, R, T 113 (DS11, DSC11, DTC11); Scania R, T 143 (DSC14 V8, DS14 V8)

Chronology
- Predecessor: Scania 2-series
- Successor: Scania 4-series

The Scania 3-series is a truck model range introduced in autumn 1987 by Swedish truck manufacturer Scania. It is the successor of the 2-series.The 3 series came in a range of different engine sizes and horsepower from 9.0 litre 230 horsepower (170 kilowatts) all the way up to 14 litre V8 500 horsepower (370 kilowatts). Production of the 3-series was stopped after the 4-series were introduced in 1995. The 3-series was the first series of Scania trucks to use the Streamline name, aiming to improve fuel efficiency and keep the styling up-to-date. The most notable changes were a redesigned bumper and front fascia incorporating a lower-drag grille design and full headlight bezels and an improved cab-side wind deflector design.

The Scania R143 is generally regarded as one of the more notable European tractor units of its time. It remains well known among truck enthusiasts for its reliability and its role in advancing heavy-duty transport.

== Gallery ==
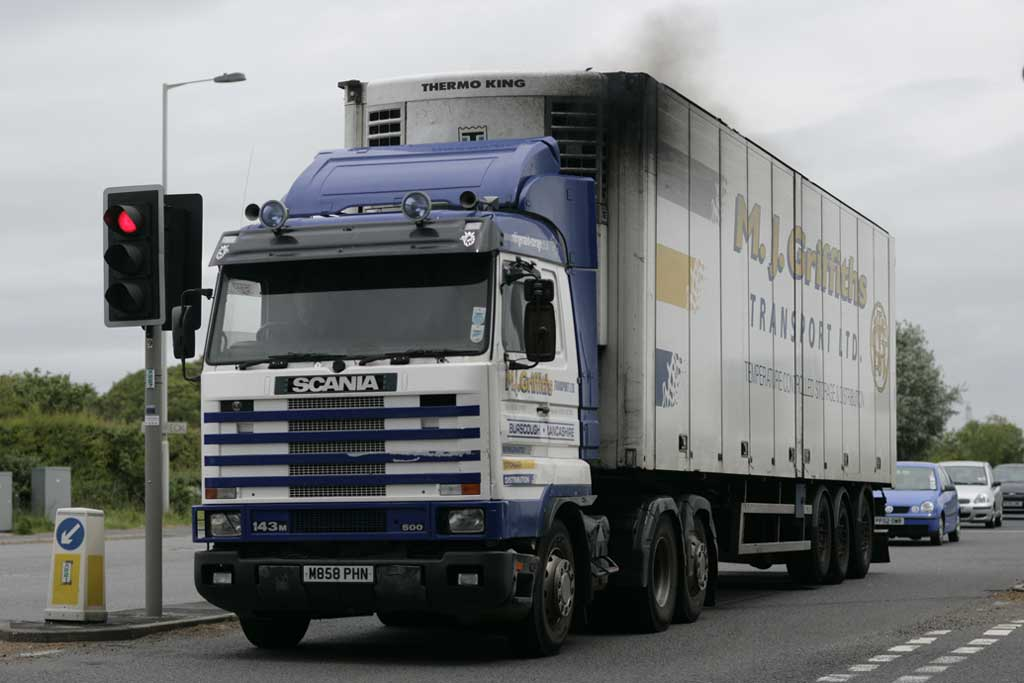
Scania R143M 500 lorry with a refrigerated trailer.

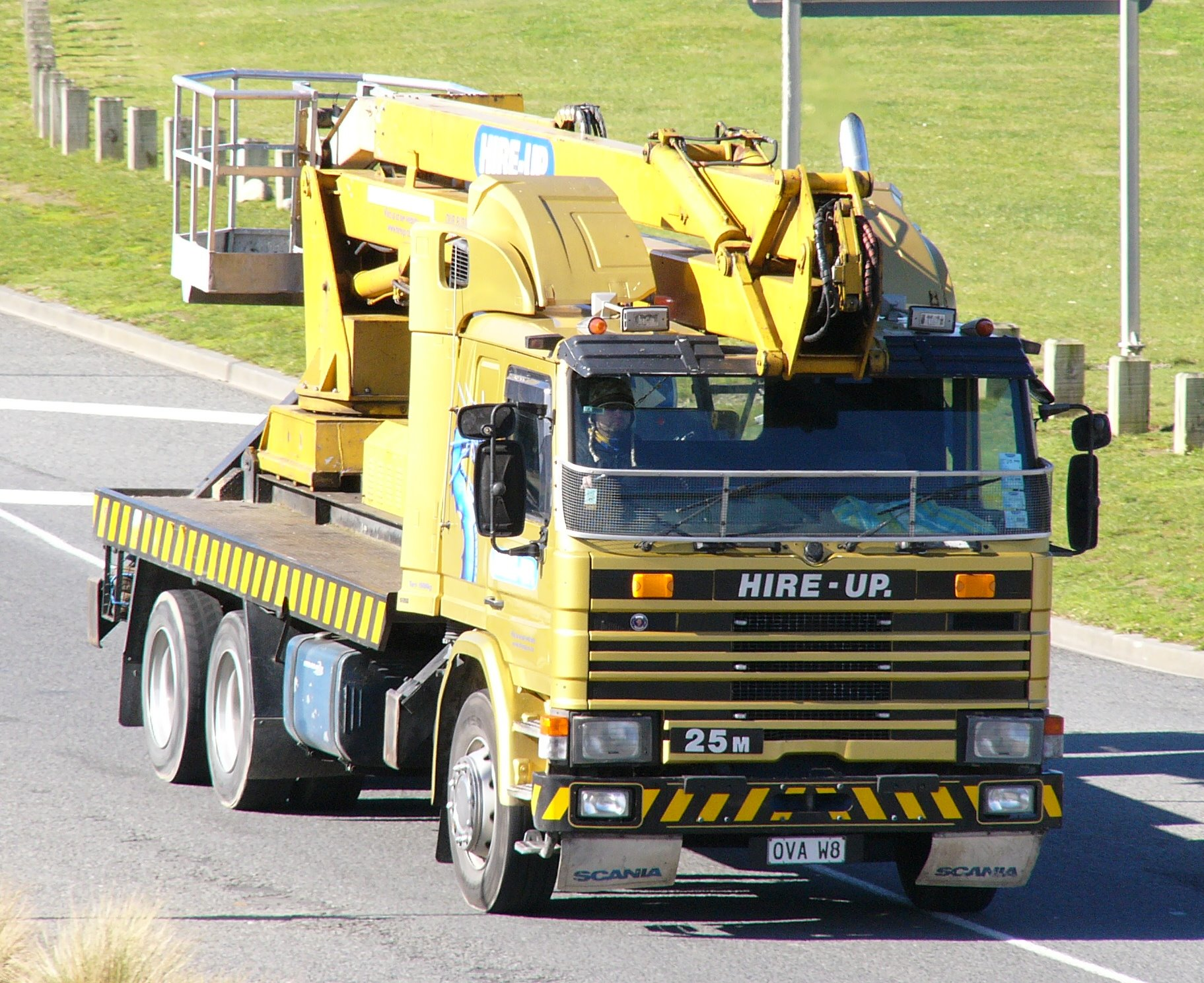
Scania P113M lorry.

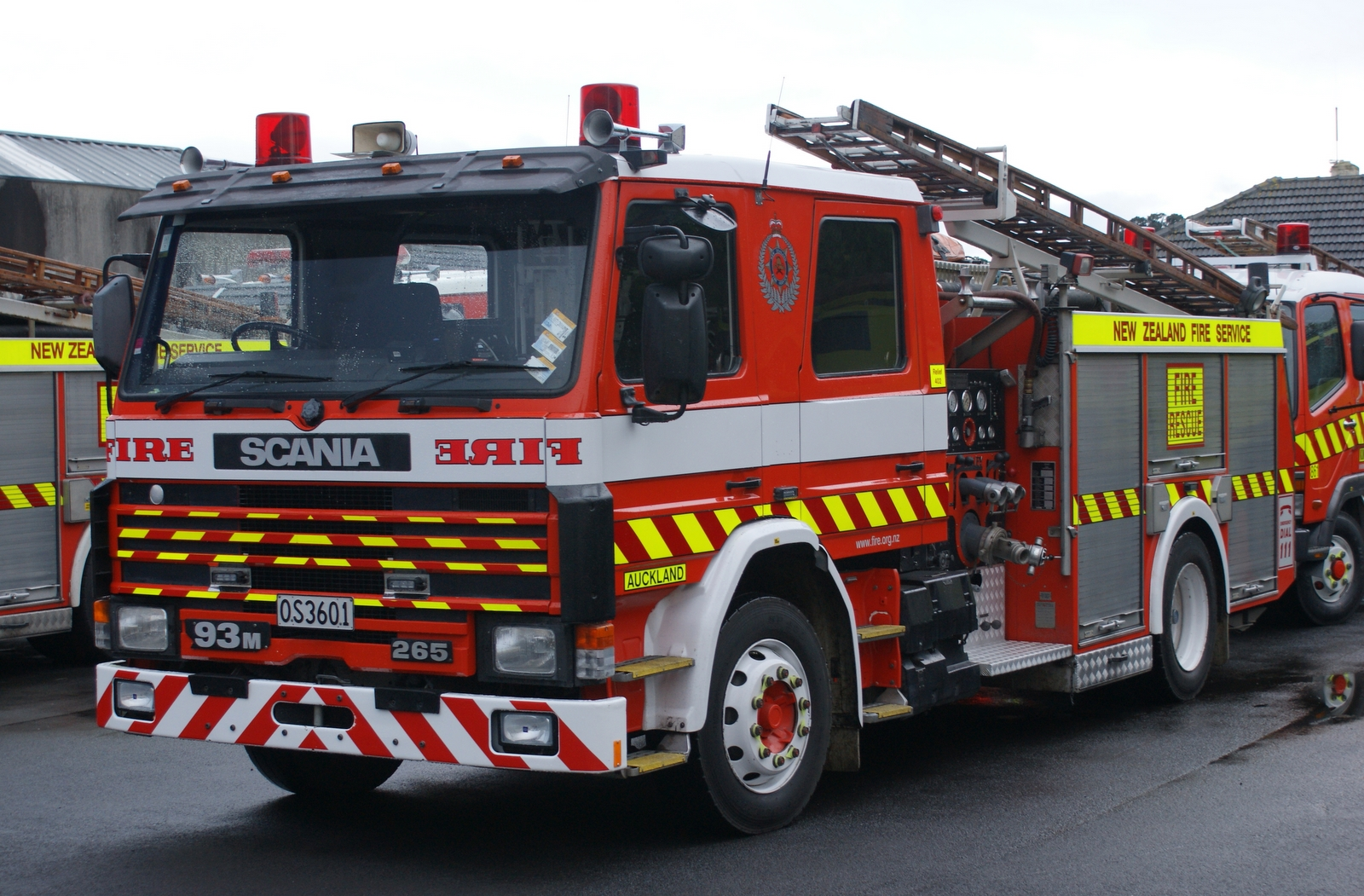
New Zealand Fire Service Scania G93M 265 fire engine.

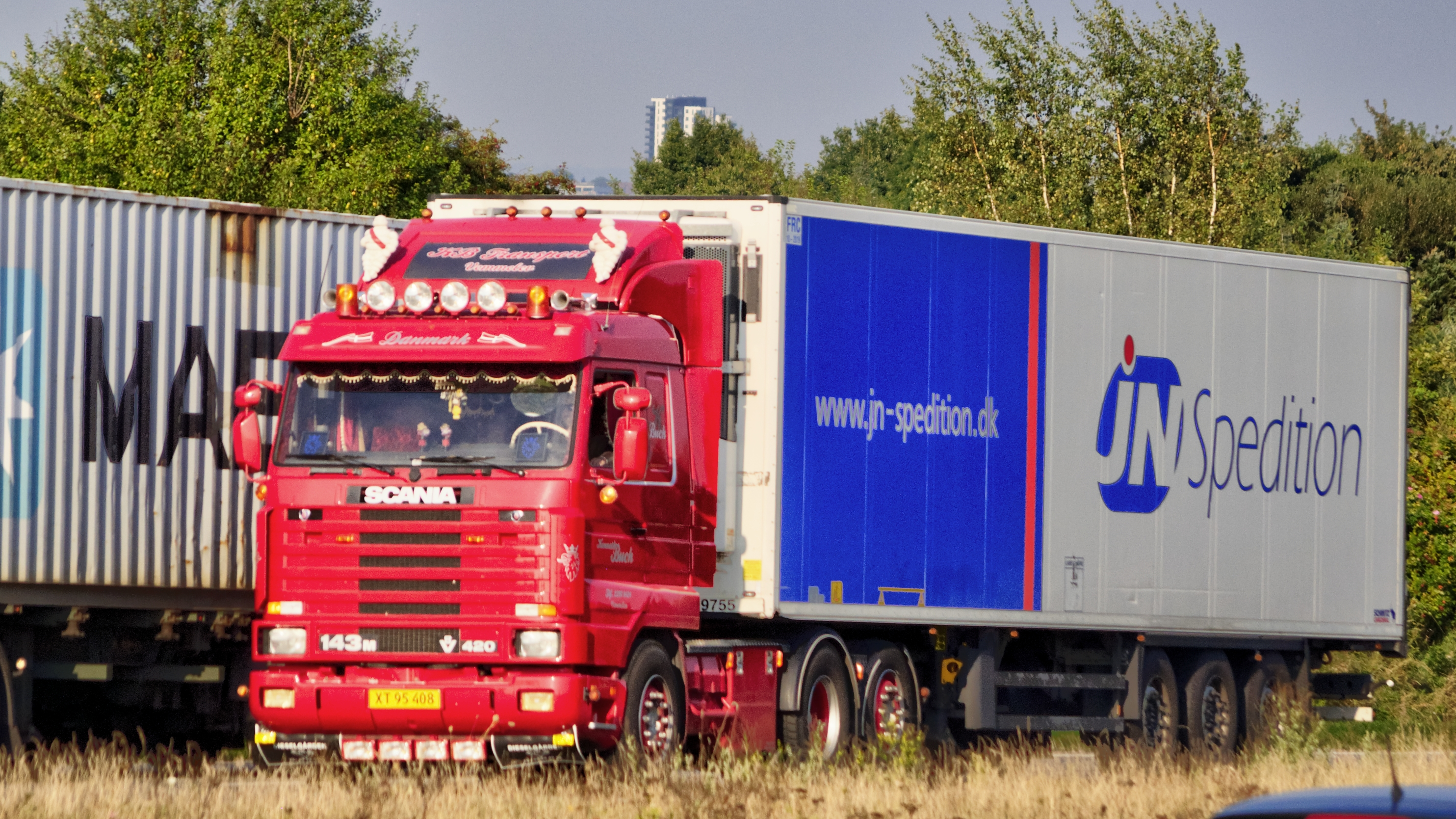
Scania 143M tractor truck with trailer in Europe

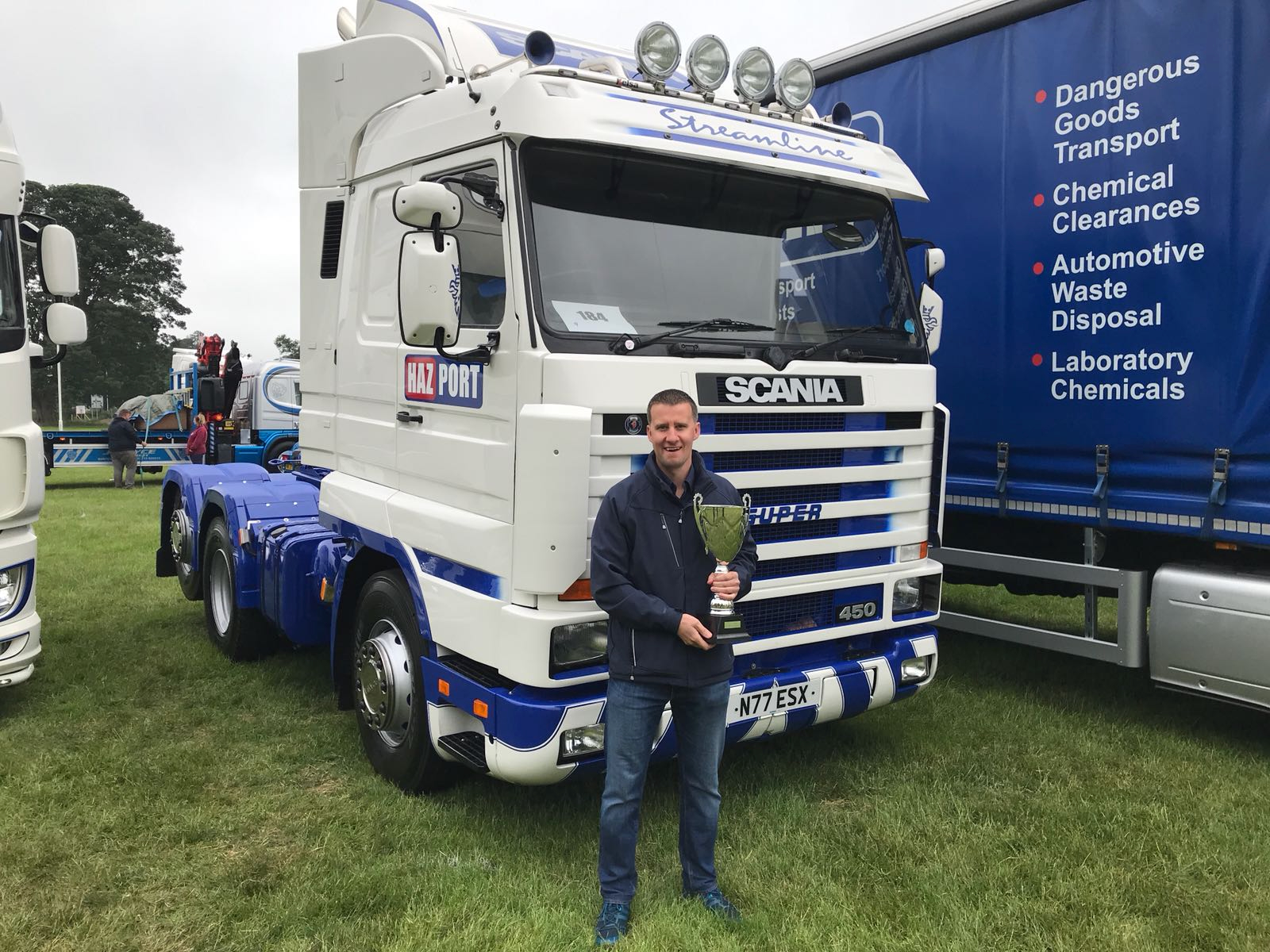
Scania 143M winning 1st prize for classic trucks at Showmotions Truck Show.

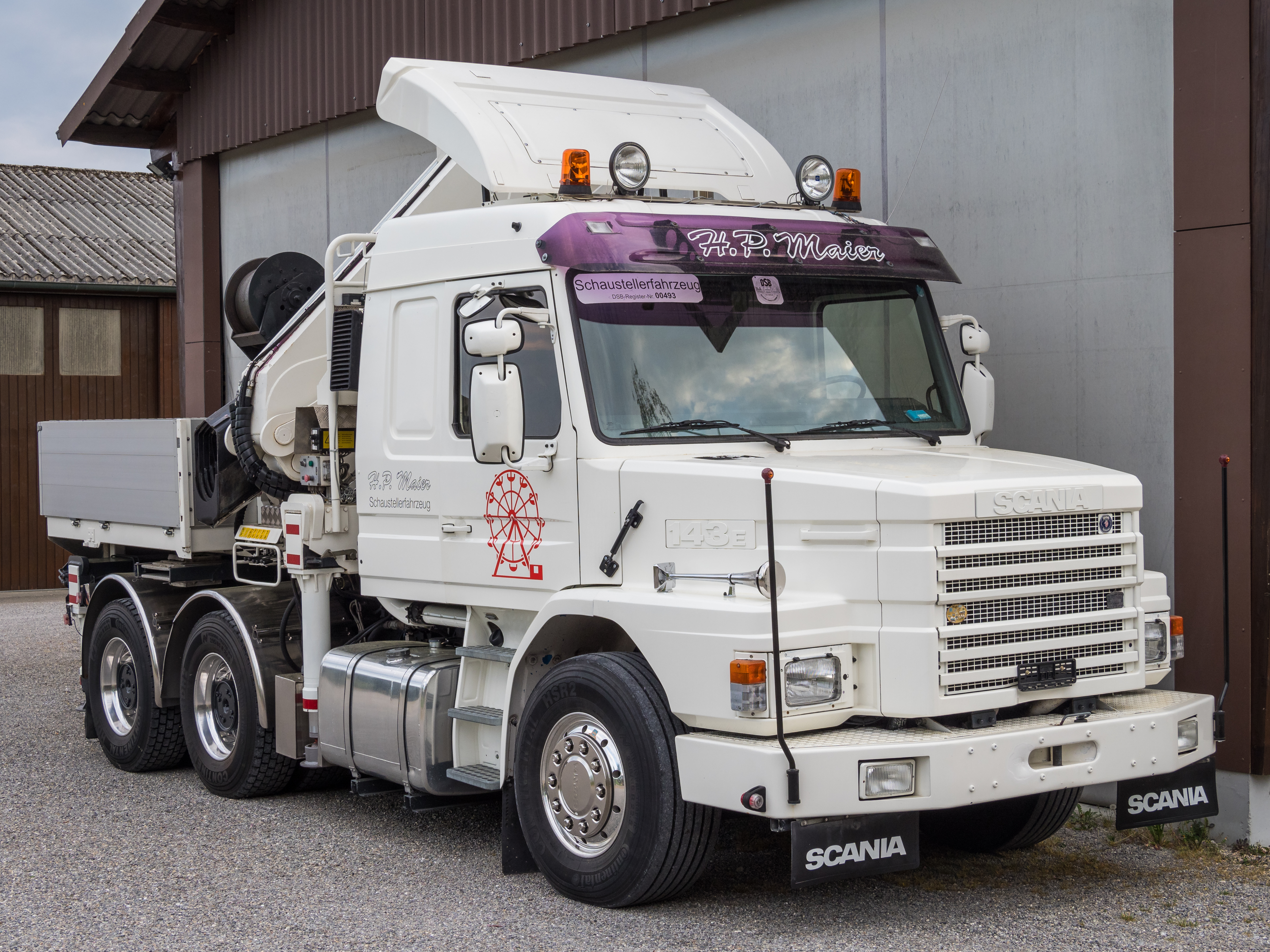
Scania T-143E

== See also ==
- Scania 3-series (bus)
- Scania PRT-range
