= Model 2 =

Model 2 may refer to:

- Boeing Model 2, an American training seaplane designed in the 1910s
- Consolidated Model 2, a training airplane used by the United States Army Air Corps
- Data General Model 2, laptop by Data General
- Experimental Model 2 submachine gun, a Japanese submachine gun in service from 1935 to 1945
- Federal Signal Model 2, an outdoor warning siren produced by Federal Signal Corporation
- JSP model 2 architecture, a complex design pattern used in the design of Java Web applications
- Sega Model 2, an arcade system board by Sega in 1993
- Smith & Wesson Model 2, an American revolver produced from 1876 through 1911
- Type 92 Model 2 Fighter, an improved version of the Japanese Type 92 Fighter

== See also ==
- Series 2 (disambiguation)
- Type 2 (disambiguation)
- M2 (disambiguation)
- MII (disambiguation)
