= System 4 =

System 4 or System IV may refer to:

- Acorn System 4, the early minicomputer
- The fourth release of Classic Mac OS
- International Computers Limited#English Electric LEO Marconi (EELM), also known as ICL System 4
- Not-released Unix system between UNIX System III and UNIX System V
- STS-4 (Space Transportation System-4), the Space Shuttle mission

== See also ==
- IBM System/4 Pi

Preceded by System 3 (disambiguation)	System 4	Succeeded by System 5
