= MII =

A Mii is a personalized digital avatar on Nintendo video game consoles.

Mii or MII may also refer to:

- 1002, the year or the number, in Roman numerals
- Mii (Jungle de Ikou!), the goddess of fertility in Jungle de Ikou!
- MII (videocassette format), a video tape format developed by Panasonic
- Maritime Institute of Ireland
- Media-independent interface, in Ethernet hardware
- Mineral Information Institute, an American educational institute
- Mutual Information Index, a measure of two random variables' mutual dependence
- Frank Miloye Milenkowichi Airport in Marília, Brazil (IATA code)
- SEAT Mii, a small car, a rebadged Volkswagen Up
- MII, cost estimating software developed for the United States Army Corps of Engineers by Project Time & Cost
- Major Industry Identifier, part of ISO/IEC 7812
- Medium Independent Interface, in the ITU-T G.hn standard for high-speed networking over home wires
- Ministry of Information Industry of the People's Republic of China, precursor to the Ministry of Industry and Information Technology of the People's Republic of China
- Cyrix MII, a rebranded Cyrix 6x86MX CPU, which was an updated Cyrix 6x86 with the MMX instruction set

== See also ==
- Model 2 (disambiguation)
- MIIS (disambiguation)
- MI (disambiguation)
- M2 (disambiguation)
