= Class II =

Class II may refer to:

- Class II antiarrhythmic
- Class II appliance
- Class II bacteriocin
- Class II cabinet
- Class II electrical appliance
- Class II gaming
- Class II gene
- Class II PI 3-kinases
- Class II railroad
- Class II star
- MHC class II

== See also ==
- Class 2 (disambiguation)
