= Class 2 =

Class 2 may refer to:

- BR Standard Class 2 2-6-0, British steam locomotive
- BR Standard Class 2 2-6-2T, British steam locomotive
- Class 2 Touring Cars, FIA classification for cars in auto racing
- Classes of United States senators
- L&YR Class 2, British 4-4-0 steam locomotive designed by William Barton Wright
- L&YR Class 2 (Aspinall), British 4-4-0 steam locomotive designed by John Aspinall
- NSB El 2, Norwegian electric locomotive
- NSB Di 2, Norwegian diesel locomotive
- SCORE Class 2, off-road racing vehicles
- A contribution class in the National Insurance system in the UK
- The second class in terms of hiking difficulty in the Yosemite Decimal System
- A speed class rating for Secure Digital cards
- A class in the electrical Appliance classes

== See also ==
- Class II (disambiguation)
- Class 02 (disambiguation)
- Type 2 (disambiguation)
