= Mi2 =

MI2, Mi2, Mi-2, M:i-2, or Mi 2 may refer to:

- MI2, the British Military Intelligence Section 2
- Mi2 (band), a Slovenian rock band founded in Rogatec in 1995
- Mi2 (console), a handheld game console developed and created by Dutch company Planet Interactive
- Mil Mi-2, small, lightly armed turbine-powered transport helicopter
- Mission: Impossible 2 (also M:i-2), a 2000 action spy film directed by John Woo
- Square mile (also mi^{2}), an imperial and US unit of measure for area
- Xiaomi Mi 2, an Android smartphone
- Monkey Island 2: LeChuck's Revenge, a 1991 video game
