= Belgian State Railways Type 2 =

Class of steam locomotive

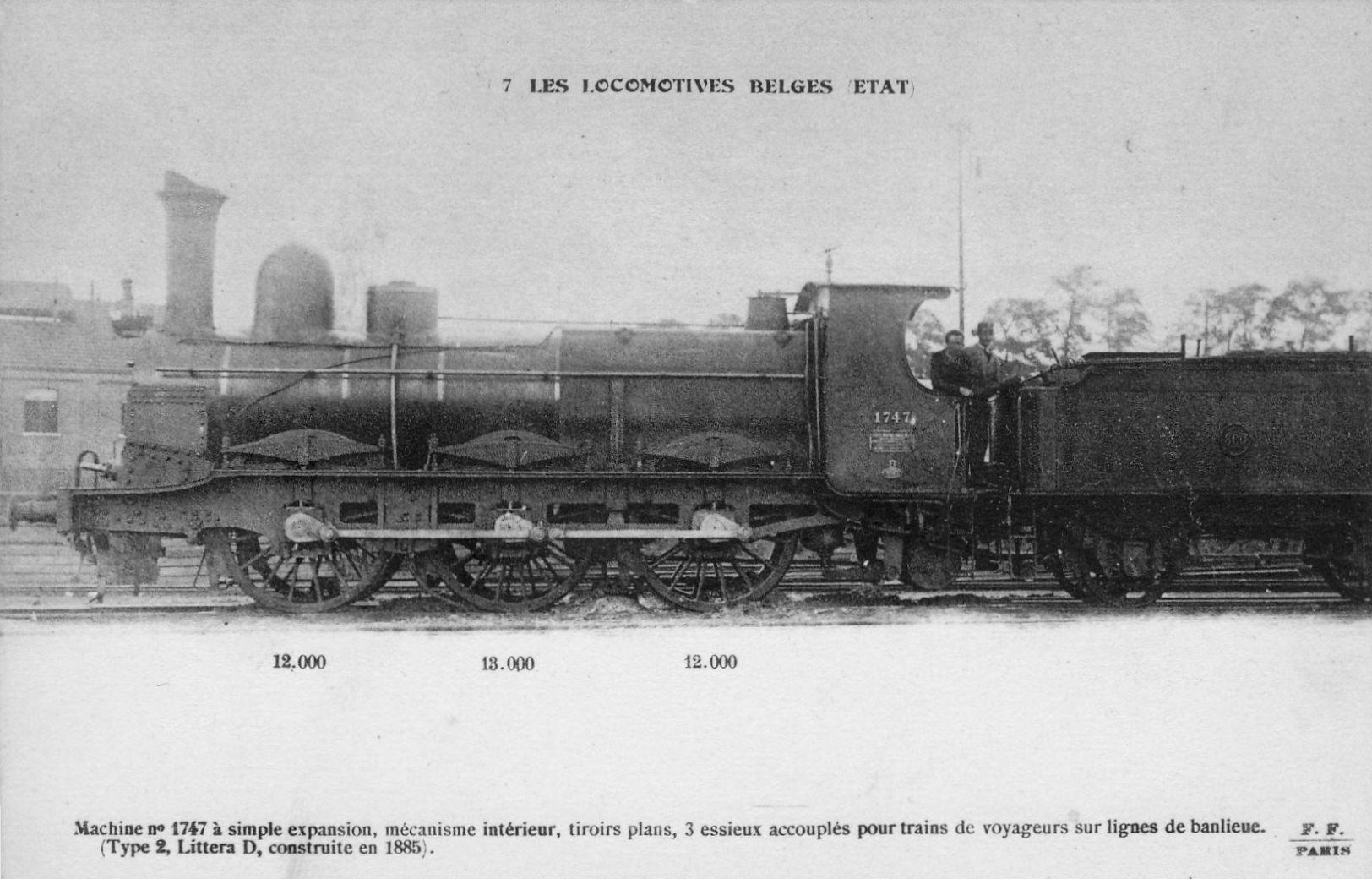
Type and origin
- Power type: Steam
- Build date: 1875–1884
- Total produced: 141 + some rebuilt Type 28
Specifications
- Configuration
  - Whyte: 0-6-0
  - UIC: C n2
- Gauge: 1,435 mm (4 ft 8 1/2 in) standard gauge
- Driver dia.: 1,700 mm (66.93 in)
- Wheelbase: 4.0 m (13 ft 1 1/2 in)
- Length: 9.338 m (30 ft 7.6 in)
- Loco weight: 38.87 t (38.26 long tons; 42.85 short tons)
- Firebox
  - Type: Belpaire
  - Grate area: 2.7667 m^{2} (29.781 sq ft)
- Boiler pressure: 8 atm (0.811 MPa; 118 psi)
- Heating surface: 109.383 m^{2} (1,177.39 sq ft)
- Cylinders: Two, inside
- Cylinder size: 450 mm × 600 mm (17.72 in × 23.62 in)
- Valve gear: Stephenson
Performance figures
- Tractive effort: 3,839 kgf (38 kN; 8,464 lbf); 4,318 kgf (42 kN; 9,520 lbf)
Career
- Operators: Belgian State Railways
- Class: Type 2

The Belgian State Railways Type 2 was a class of 0-6-0 steam locomotives for passenger service introduced in 1875.

== Construction history ==
Alfred Belpaire developed the class from the Type 28 by increasing their driving wheels from 1,450 mm (57.09 in) to 1,700 mm (66.93 in). The class had Belpaire fireboxes, external frames and internal cylinders connected by Stephenson valve gear.

In 1882, a number of Type 2 and Type 28 engines were rebuilt as the 2-4-0 Type 2bis, totalling 31 locomotives. This was done on the Type 2 by using the Type 28 driving axle as leading wheels.

== Bibliography ==
- Tordeur, Emile (1909). Le Machiniste des Chemins de Fer Belges (in French).
- Dambly, Phil (Oct 1966). "Nos inoubliables vapeurs - Troisième période, 1864-1884 - Régime Belpaire". Le Rail (in French). No. 122.
- Morandiere, Jules (Jan 1886). "Les locomotives à l'Exposition d'Anvers 1885". Revue générale des chemins de fer (in French). 9, 1er Semestre. Paris: P. Vicq-Dunod: 33–47. OCLC 6536095.
- Vandenberghen, J. (1988). Période Belpaire - Masui (in French). Bruxelles: SNCB.
