= Scania 2-series =

Scania Two-Series

Overview
- Manufacturer: Scania
- Production: 1980–1989
- Assembly: Södertälje, Sweden
- Designer: Italdesign Giugiaro

Body and chassis
- Class: Heavy truck
- Body style: COE; Conventional; Day cab; Streamline

Chronology
- Predecessor: Scania 1-series
- Successor: Scania 3-series

The Scania GPRT range, later known as the Scania 2-series, is a truck model range introduced in 1980 by Swedish truck manufacturer Scania. It is the successor of the "1-series". The 2-series came in a range of different engine sizes and power ratings from 7.8 litres I6 to a 14.2-litre V8 engine. Production of the 2-series was stopped after the 3-series were introduced in 1987, but the production of the 2-series continued in Argentina and Brazil until 1992. The range was first shown in the spring of 1980 as the bonneted (conventional-cab) T-series (for "Torpedo", not to be confused with the 2004 T-series). The cab, also featuring an all-new interior, was designed by Giorgetto Giugiaro. The 2-series was also manufactured by Scania's Brazilian operations, beginning in 1982. In 1984, the 8.5-litre "92" series was added.

The engines available in this Scania model were DN8 (7,790 cc naturally aspirated), DS8 (7,790 cc turbo), DSI8 (7,790 cc intercooler turbo), DS9 (8,476 cc turbo), DSC9 (8,476 cc intercooler turbo), DN11 (11,021 cc naturally aspirated), DS11 (11,021 cc turbo), DSC11 (11,021cc intercooler turbo), DS14 (14,188cc V8 turbo) and DSC14 (14,188cc V8 intercooler turbo).

Letter suffixes M, H, or E, relate to frame/suspension ratings - "medium", "heavy", or "extra-heavy" duty. Prefixes used are as follows:

- G – rigidly mounted short, low cab
- P – suspended low cab, short or long (single berth)
- R – high cab, short or long (double berth)
- T – bonneted (conventional) cab, short or long (double berth)

== Bonneted (conventional-cab) model (T) ==
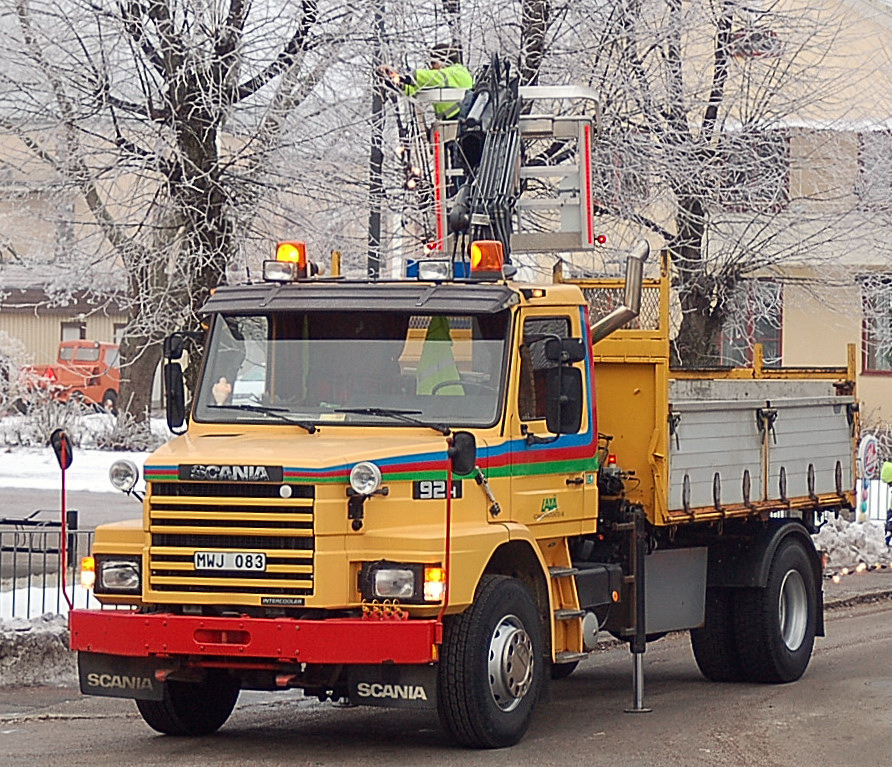
1986 Scania T92H

At the time of introduction, the 2-series "T" was available with either a 7.8, 11.0, or 14.2-litre engine. These were denoted 82, 112, or 142.

== See also ==
- Scania 3-series
