= System 2 =

System Two, System II or System 2 may refer to:

== Computing ==
- Acorn System 2, the early microcomputer
- Apple System 2, the operating system version for the Apple Macintosh
- Capcom System 2, an arcade system board in the 1990s
- Cromemco System Two, a computer system by Cromemco from 1978
- Channel F System II, game console by Fairchild
- Digital Access Signalling System 2, the protocol by British Telecom
- Global File System 2, the file system by Red Hat
- Master System II, the 8-bit video game console by Sega
- Namco System 2, the arcade system board by Namco
- Sega System 2, an arcade system board in the 1990s
- S2 (programming language), style system 2

== Cognition ==
- System 1 and System 2 as hypothesized regarding cognition: see Thinking, Fast and Slow

== Entertainment: games, music, etc ==
- System 2 in Trilogy, an album from rock band Angeldust
- Super System 2, the poker system
- System Shock 2, the computer game

== See also ==
- Operating System/2 by IBM
- Personal System/2 by IBM

Preceded by System 1	System 2	Succeeded by System 3 (disambiguation)
