= 500 series =

500 series may refer to the following:

- 500 Series Shinkansen, a high-speed train type operated by West Japan Railway Company on the Tokaido Shinkansen and Sanyo Shinkansen lines in Japan
- Chichibu Railway 500 series, a Japanese train type operated by Chichibu Railway
- Meitetsu 500 series, a Japanese train type to be operated by Nagoya Railroad
- Tobu 500 series, a Japanese train type operated by Tobu Railway
- 500-series format, a standardized format for modular audio signal processing equipment

== Computing ==
- GeForce 500 series graphics processing units
- Radeon RX 500 series graphics processing units
- ThinkPad 500 series, a line of laptop computers

== See also ==
- Series 5 (disambiguation)
- 500 (disambiguation)
- 5000 series (disambiguation)

Preceded by Series 401-499 (disambiguation)	500 series	Succeeded by Series 501-599 (disambiguation)
Preceded by 400 series (disambiguation)	500 series	Succeeded by 600 series (disambiguation)
