= 400 (disambiguation) =

400 may refer to:

- 400 (number), the natural number following 399 and preceding 401
- A year: 400 BC or AD 400
- The Four Hundred, the oligarchic government controlling Athens after the Athenian coup of 411 BC
- The Four Hundred (Gilded Age), the social elite of New York City in the late 19th century
- The Game's Four Hundred, the subtitle of the almanac, the Baseball Register
- List of highways numbered 400
- Twin Cities 400, a passenger train operated by Chicago & Northwestern Railway from 1935 to 1963
- 400 (card game), a Lebanese trick-taking game
- HTTP 400, the HTTP error code for "Bad Request"
- Ping Shan stop, Hong Kong; station code
- TV400, the former name of Swedish television channel Kanal 11 (Swedish TV channel)

== Vehicles ==
- Chevrolet 400, a compact car
- Tank 400, a mid-size SUV
- Ferrari 400, a grand tourer
- Lloyd 400, a supermini car
- Vespa 400, a microcar

== See also ==
- 400th (disambiguation)
- 400 series (disambiguation)
