= System 6 (disambiguation) =

System 6 or System/6 may refer to:

== Computing ==
- IBM Office System/6, a minicomputer developed by IBM; premiered in 1977

Operating systems:

- System Software 6, the Apple operating system introduced in 1988
- Version 6 Unix, released in 1975

== Other ==
- System 6, line of BMW Motorrad helmets
- System 6, line of Cannondale bicycles
- 6.0 system, the figure skating judging system
- D6 System, the role-playing game system
- Signalling System 6, telephony signaling protocols
- STS-6 (Space Transportation System-6), the Space Shuttle mission

== See also ==
- Series 6 (disambiguation)

Preceded by System 5	System 6	Succeeded by System 7 (disambiguation)
