= Mode 3 =

Mode 3 may refer to:

- Mode 3 (telephone), a method of line sharing in telephony
- Mode 3, electric vehicle charging protocol according to IEC 62196
- Mode III, a class of stone tools, the Mousterian industry
- Mode 3, a sociological term for the production of knowledge; see quadruple and quintuple innovation helix framework
