= 600 series =

600 series may refer to:

== Japanese train types ==
- Keihan 600 series, a train operated by Keihan Electric Railway since 1984
- Keikyu 600 series, a train operated by Keikyu since 1994
- Keikyu 600 series, a train operated by Keikyu from 1956, which later became the Keikyu 700 series (1956)
- E1 Series Shinkansen, originally scheduled to be classified "600 series"

== Computing and electronics ==
- 600 series connector, the Australian standard telephone handset connector before the introduction of the RJ11 and RJ12 modular connectors
- GE-600 series mainframe computers
- GeForce 600 series graphics processing units
- Radeon 600 series graphics processing units
- ThinkPad 600 series, a line of laptop computers

== Other ==
- Bombardier Challenger 600 business jets
- Daimler-Benz DB 600 series aircraft engines
- French 600 Series submarines
- Italian 600 Series submarines
- Rover 600 Series car

== See also ==
- Series 6 (disambiguation)
- 6000 series (disambiguation)

Preceded by Series 501-599 (disambiguation)	600 series	Succeeded by Series 601-699 (disambiguation)
Preceded by 500 series (disambiguation)	600 series	Succeeded by 700 series (disambiguation)
