= 400 series =

400 series may refer to:

== Consumer graphics cards ==
- Radeon RX 400 series
- GeForce 400 series

== Japanese train types ==
- 400 Series Shinkansen
- GV-E400 series, a DEMU train operated by JR East
- Osaka Metro 400 series, operated by Osaka Metro since 2023

== Other ==
- 400-series highways, a network of freeways in Southern Ontario, Canada
- Rover 400 Series, a small British family car
- GE-400 series, computers produced by General Electric in the 1960s
- Kodak DCS 400 series, a series of digital SLR cameras produced by Eastman Kodak
- Toshiba Satellite Pro 400 series, a series of laptops by Toshiba

== See also ==
- Series 4 (disambiguation)
- 400 (disambiguation)
- 4000 series

Preceded by Series 301-399 (disambiguation)	400 series	Succeeded by Series 401-499 (disambiguation)
Preceded by 300 series (disambiguation)	400 series	Succeeded by 500 series (disambiguation)
