= Series 5 =

Series 5 may refer to:

- Aston Martin V8 Series 5, an automobile model
- BMW 5 Series, a line of automobiles
- GeForce 5 Series, a line of video cards
- Psion Series 5, a line of handheld computers
- South African Class 6E1, Series 5, a series of electric locomotives

== See also ==
- 500 series (disambiguation)
- System 5

Preceded by Series 4 (disambiguation)	Series 5	Succeeded by Series 6 (disambiguation)
