= Chichibu Railway 2000 series =

Class of 4 Japanese 4-car electric multiple units

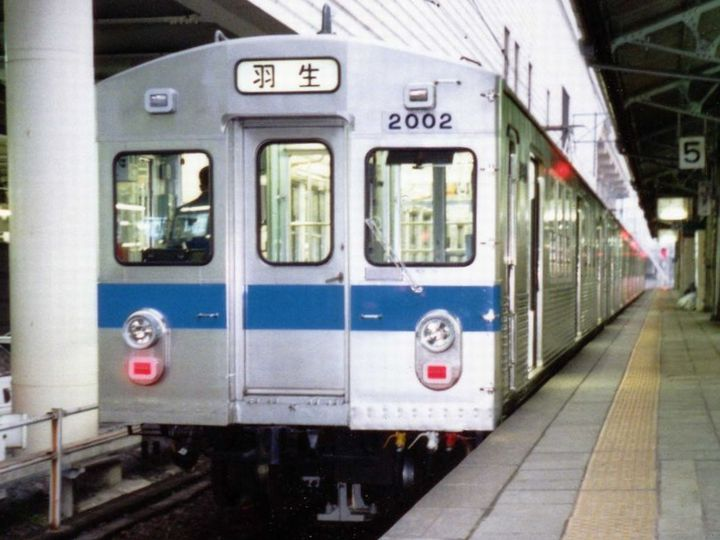
- A 2000 series trainset at Kumagaya Station in 1992
- In service: 1991–2000
- Replaced: 500 series
- Scrapped: 2000
- Number built: 16 vehicles (4 sets)
- Number scrapped: 16 vehicles (4 sets)
- Formation: 4 cars per trainset
- Operator: Chichibu Railway
- Depot: Kumagaya
- Line served: Chichibu Main Line

Specifications
- Car body construction: Stainless steel
- Car length: 18 m (59 ft 1 in)
- Doors: 3 pairs per side
- Electric system: 1,500 V DC
- Current collection: Overhead wire
- Track gauge: 1,067 mm (3 ft 6 in)

The Chichibu Railway 2000 series (秩父鉄道2000系) was an electric multiple unit (EMU) train type for local services operated by the private railway operator Chichibu Railway in Japan.

== History ==
Four 4-car trains were converted in 1991 from former Tokyu 7000 series commuter EMUs. The trains were not air-conditioned.

== Formation ==
Trainsets were formed as follows.

DeHa	DeHa	DeHa	DeHa
2001 (ex DeHa 7017)	2101 (ex DeHa 7160)	2201 (ex DeHa 7159)	2301 (ex DeHa 7036)
2002 (ex DeHa 7035)	2102 (ex DeHa 7162)	2202 (ex DeHa 7161)	2302 (ex DeHa 7016)
2003 (ex DeHa 7021)	2103 (ex DeHa 7170)	2203 (ex DeHa 7121)	2303 (ex DeHa 7022)
2004 (ex DeHa 7061)	2104 (ex DeHa 7146)	2204 (ex DeHa 7145)	2304 (ex DeHa 7028)

The 2100 and 2300 cars each had one lozenge-type pantograph.
