= Series 7 =

Series 7 may refer to:

- The seventh season of any of many shows or series; see and
- Series 7 exam, officially the General Securities Representative Exam, the most comprehensive financial securities exam offered by the FINRA
- Series 7: The Contenders, a movie made in 2001. This film is also commonly referred to as Series 7
- Series 7 or Series VII, a size of Photographic Filter used on cameras and other optical devices
- Series 7, often used to describe the BMW 7 Series of automobiles
- Series 7 olinsky sable-hair brushes from Winsor & Newton
- Psion Series 7, a notebook computer from Psion
- Series of seven

== See also ==
- 700 series (disambiguation)
- System 7 (disambiguation)

Preceded by Series 6 (disambiguation)	Series 7	Succeeded by Series 8
