= System 7 (disambiguation) =

System 7 or System/7 may refer to:

== Entertainment ==
- System 7 (band), a British electronic music duo
  - System 7 (album), eponymous, debut studio album of System 7; released in 1991
- System 7 Napoleonics, tabletop miniatures wargaming

== Technology ==
=== Computing ===
- IBM System/7, a minicomputer developed by IBM; premiered in 1971

Operating systems:

  - Macintosh System 7, the Apple operating system introduced in 1991
  - Operating System/7, the UNIVAC operating system introduced in 1974
  - System Manager 7, a successor to Multiuser DOS by Datapac
  - Version 7 Unix, otherwise known as (Unix Time Sharing) System 7; released in 1979

=== Other ===
- Signalling System 7, telephony signaling protocols
- STS-7 (Space Transportation System-7), the Space Shuttle mission

== See also ==
- Series 7 (disambiguation)

Preceded by System 6 (disambiguation)	System 7	Succeeded by System 8 (disambiguation)
