= Series 4 =

Series 4 could refer to:

- Aston Martin Lagonda Series 4, the automobile model
- BMW 4 Series, the automobile model line
- GeForce 4 series, line of nVidia video cards
- Scania 4-series, the truck model line
- South African Class 6E1, Series 4, electric locomotive series
- Series 4, the registered options principal exam

== See also ==
- 400 series (disambiguation)
- System 4 (disambiguation)

Preceded by Series 3 (disambiguation)	Series 4	Succeeded by Series 5 (disambiguation)
