= 500 Series Shinkansen =

Japanese high speed train type

500 series
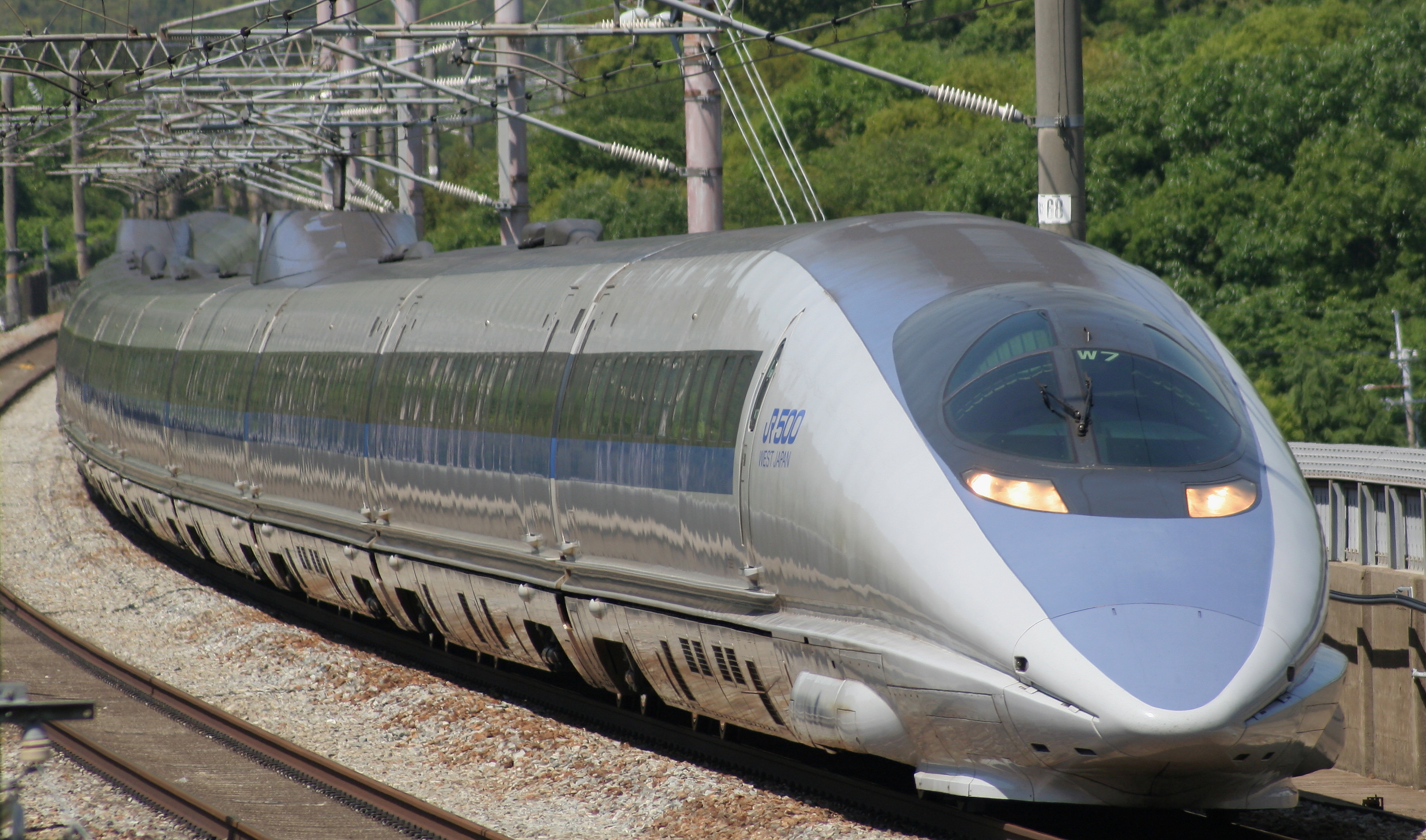
- 16-car 500 series on a Nozomi service, May 2008
- Stock type: Electric multiple unit
- In service: 22 March 1997 – present
- Manufacturers: Hitachi, Kawasaki Heavy Industries, Kinki Sharyo, Nippon Sharyo
- Designer: Alexander Neumeister
- Replaced: 0 series (Kodama)
- Constructed: 1995–1998
- Entered service: 1997
- Refurbished: 2008–2010
- Number built: 144 vehicles (9 sets)
- Number in service: 48 vehicles (6 sets)
- Number preserved: 2 vehicles
- Number scrapped: 78 vehicles
- Successor: N700 and N700A series
- Formation: 8 (originally 16) cars per trainset
- Fleet numbers: As built: W1–W9; As refurbished: V2–V9
- Capacity: 16-car W set: 1,324 (200 Green + 1,124 Standard); 8-car V set: 608
- Operator: JR West
- Depot: Hakata
- Lines served: San'yō Shinkansen; ■ Hakataminami Line; Tokaido Shinkansen (1997–2010)

Specifications
- Car body construction: Aluminium alloy, Honeycomb structure
- Car length: 25 m (82 ft 0 in) (intermediate cars); 27 m (88 ft 7 in) (end cars)
- Width: 3,380 mm (11 ft 1 in)
- Height: 3,690 mm (12 ft 1 in)
- Doors: Two plug doors per side (intermediate cars); One plug door per side (end cars)
- Maximum speed: W set: 270 km/h (168 mph) (Tōkaidō) 300 km/h (186 mph) (Sanyō); V set: 285 km/h (177 mph); Design speed: 320 km/h (199 mph)
- Traction system: (AC) WMT204 64 × 285 kW (382 hp) (set W1)/275 kW (369 hp) (set W2 onward)
- Power output: 18.24 MW (24,460 hp) (set W1), 17.60 MW (23,600 hp) (set W2 onward)
- Acceleration: 1.6 km/(h⋅s) (0.99 mph/s); 1.92 km/(h⋅s) (1.19 mph/s) (High acceleration mode)
- Deceleration: 2.7 km/(h⋅s) (1.7 mph/s)
- Electric system: 25 kV AC, 60 Hz overhead catenary
- Current collection: W set: "T"-style current collector; V set: Pantograph
- Safety system: ATC-NS
- Track gauge: 1,435 mm (4 ft 8 1/2 in) standard gauge

Notes/references
- This train won the 41st Blue Ribbon Award in 1998.

The 500 series (500系, Go-hyaku-kei) is a Shinkansen high-speed train type operated by West Japan Railway Company (JR-West) in Japan on the Tōkaidō Shinkansen line from 1997 until 2010, and the San'yō Shinkansen line since 1997. They were designed to be capable of 320 km/h (199 mph) but operated at 300 km/h (186 mph), until they were retired from the primary Nozomi service in 2010. The trainsets were then refurbished and downgraded to the all-stations Kodama service between Shin-Ōsaka and Hakata.

== Overview ==
The general design concept was overseen by German industrial designer Alexander Neumeister. The running gear utilizes computer-controlled active suspension for a smoother, safer ride, and yaw dampers are fitted between cars for improved stability. All sixteen cars in each original trainset were powered, giving a maximum of 18.24 MW (24,460 hp). Each train cost an estimated 5 billion yen and only nine were built. It used biomimicry to reduce energy consumption by 15%, increase speeds by 10% and reduce noise levels while increasing passenger comfort. This was done by designing the train's front to mimic the shape of a kingfisher's beak.

== 6-car 500-900 WIN350 set ==
"WIN350" was the name given to the 500-900 series (500系900番台) 6-car experimental high-speed Shinkansen train developed in 1992 by the West Japan Railway Company (JR West) in Japan to test technology to be incorporated in next-generation shinkansen trains expected to operate at speeds of 350 km/h (217 mph) from 1994. Initially given the designation "500X", the name "WIN350" stood for "West Japan's Innovation for operation at 350 km/h".

== 16-car W sets ==
First announced by JR-West in September 1994, the first set was delivered for testing in 1995, entering passenger service in March 1997. The entire fleet of nine sets was delivered by 1998. It was the first Shinkansen train in Japan to operate at a maximum speed of 300 km/h (186 mph) in regular passenger service. Besides the premium Nozomi services, 16-car trains were also used on Hikari Rail Star services during the busy holiday periods or as substitutes for the 700-7000 series.

With the steady increase in the number of N700 Series Shinkansen since 2007, the 500 series were gradually retired from the Nozomi services. The last 500 series Nozomi run took place on 28 February 2010.

=== Formation ===
Car No.	1	2	3	4	5	6	7	8	9	10	11	12	13	14	15	16
Designation	Mc	M1	Mp	M2	M'	M1	Mp	Ms2	Ms	M1s	Mpkh	M2	M'	M1	Mp	M2c
Numbering	521-xx	526-xx	527-xx	528-xx	525-xx	526-xx	527-4xx	518-xx	515-xx	516-xx	527-7xx	528-7xx	525-xx	526-xx	527-xx	522-xx
Seating capacity	53	100	90	100	95	100	75	68	64	68	63	100	95	100	90	63

Cars 8 to 10 were "Green" (first class) cars. Cars 5 and 13 each had one "T"-style current collector.

=== Interior ===
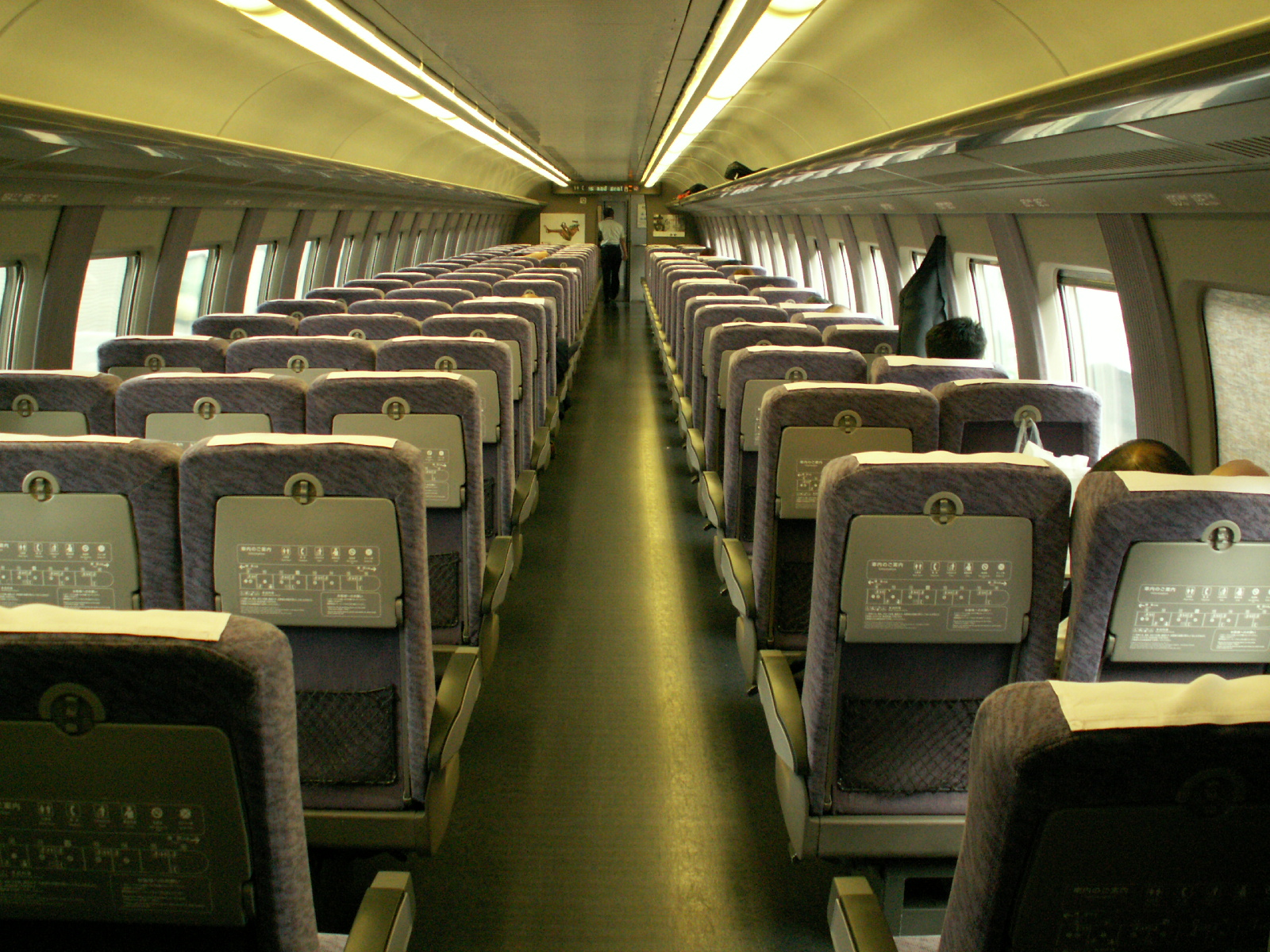
Standard-class car interior view

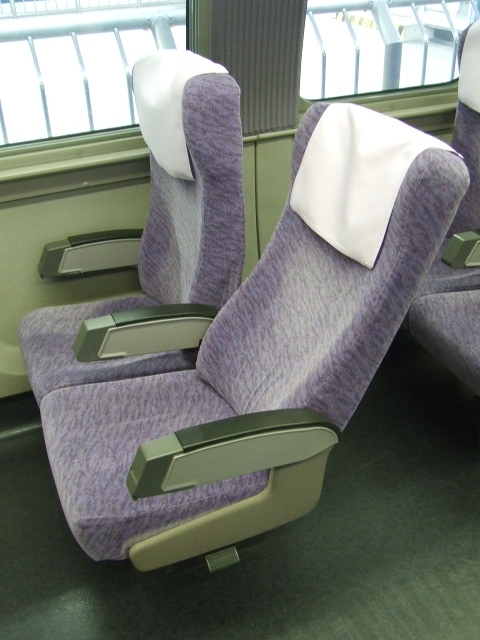
Standard-class seating

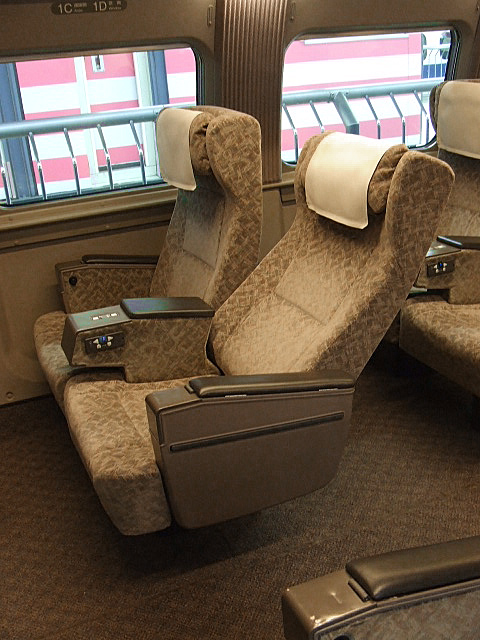
Green car seating

== 8-car V sets (500-7000 series) ==
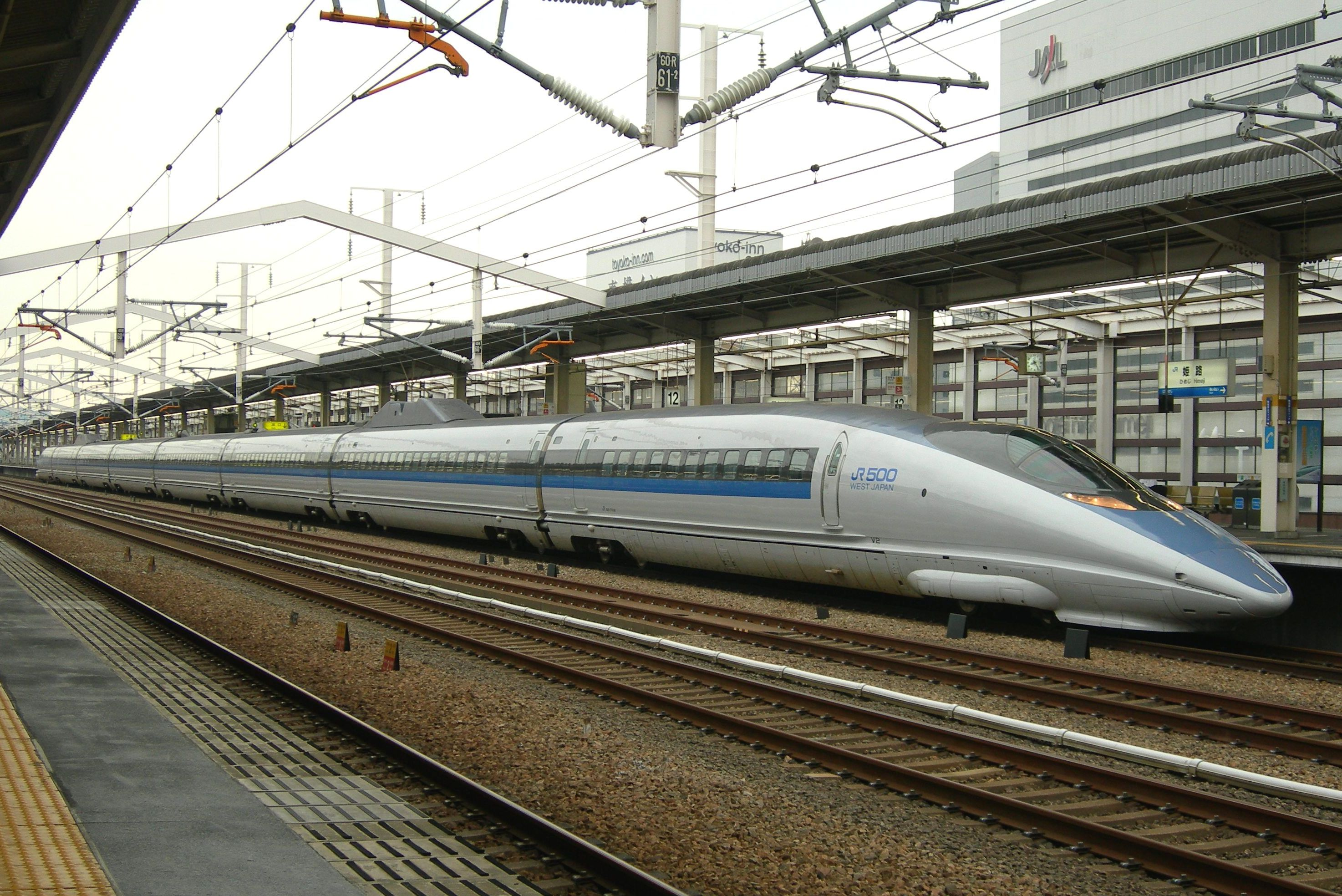
An 8-car 500 series Kodama set at Himeji Station in August 2009

Eight of the original nine 500 series sets were modified and shortened to eight cars between 2008 and 2010, and were cascaded to Sanyo Shinkansen Kodama workings, replacing the earlier 0 series sets (V2 to V9). The first reformed eight-car set was unveiled to the press on 28 March 2008, and the trains entered service on twelve daily Kodama runs from 1 December 2008.

The maximum operating speed of these trains has been reduced to 285 km/h (177 mph).

=== Formation ===
As of 27 March 2023, the fleet consists of six eight-car sets (V2–V4, V7–V9) formed as follows, with car 1 at the Hakata end.

Car No.	1	2	3	4	5	6	7	8
Designation	Mc	M1	Mp	M2	M	M1	Mpkh	M2c
Numbering	521-70xx	526-70xx	527-70xx	528-70xx	525-70xx	526-72xx	527-77xx	522-70xx
Formerly	521 (car 1)	526 (car 2)	527 (car 3)	528 (car 4)	525 (car 13)	516 (car 10)	527-700 (car 11)	522 (car 16)
Seating capacity	53	100	78	100	95	68	51	63

Cars 2 and 7 each have one single-arm pantograph.

=== Interior ===
Passenger accommodation consists of 3+2 abreast unidirectional seating, with 2+2 abreast seating in car 6 (former Green car). Between October and December 2013, cars 4 and 5 are also scheduled to have the original seating removed and replaced with new 2+2 abreast seating, the same as used in the Hikari Rail Star 700 series trainsets.

All passenger saloons on the 8-car 500 series trains are no-smoking, with new smoking compartments installed in cars 3 and 7. Cars 1, 3, 5, and 7 are equipped with toilets.

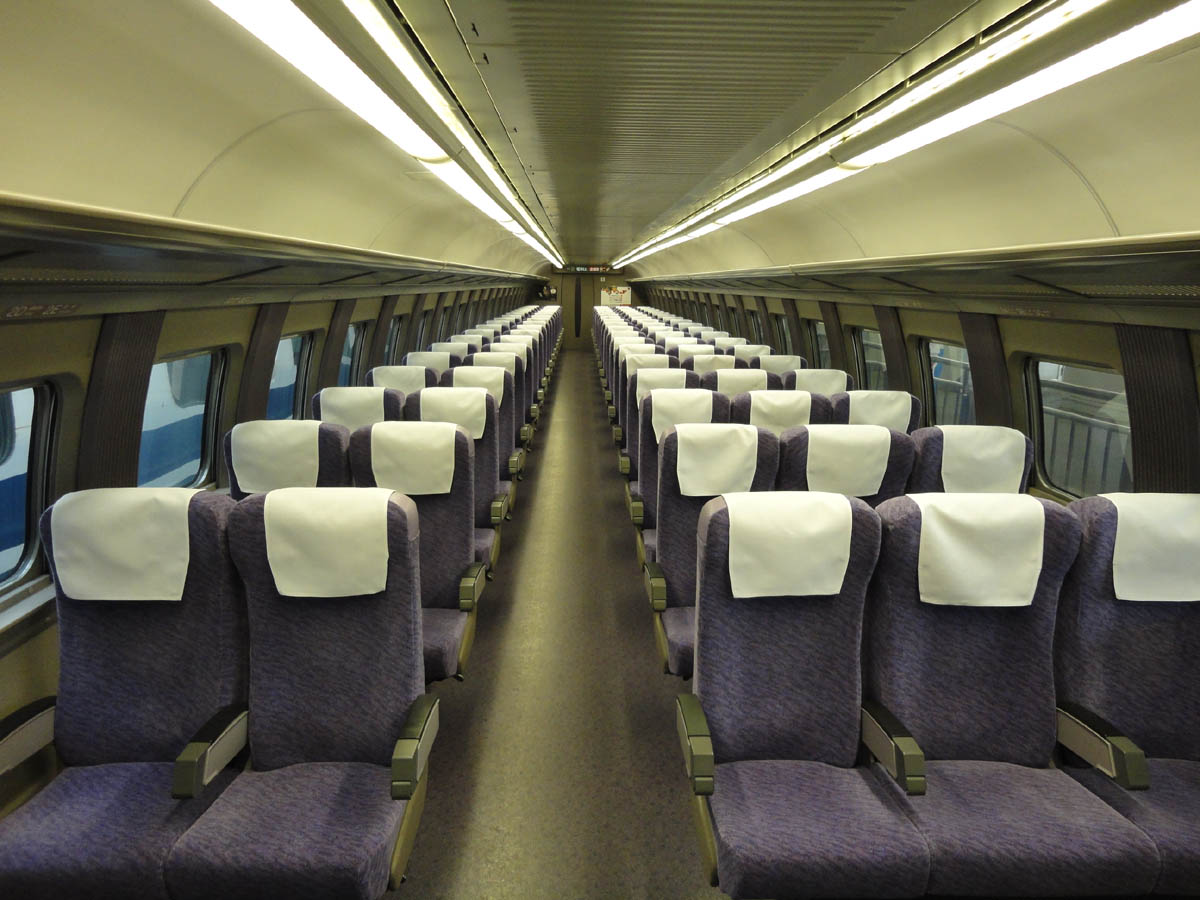
Non-reserved seating car in May 2012

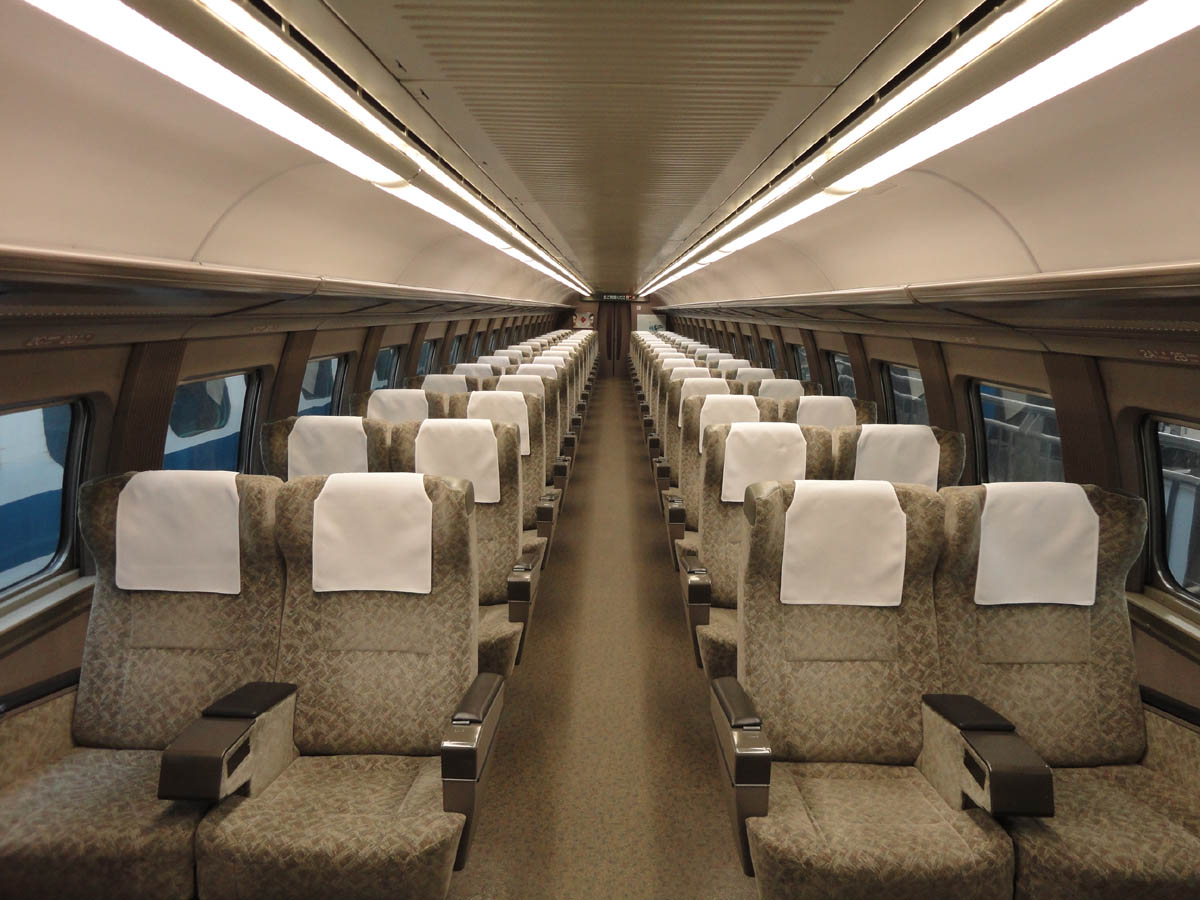
Reserved seating car (car 6) in May 2012

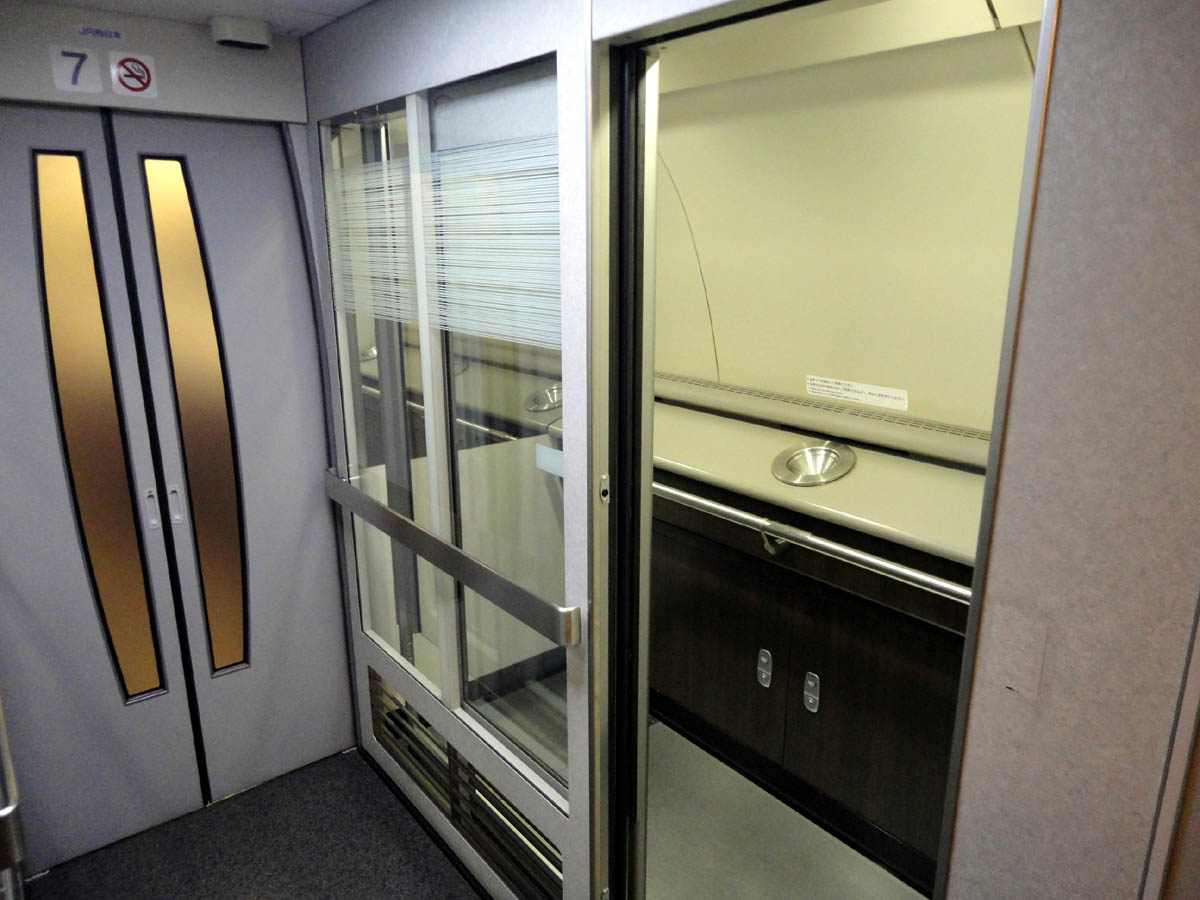
Smoking compartment in car 7 in May 2012

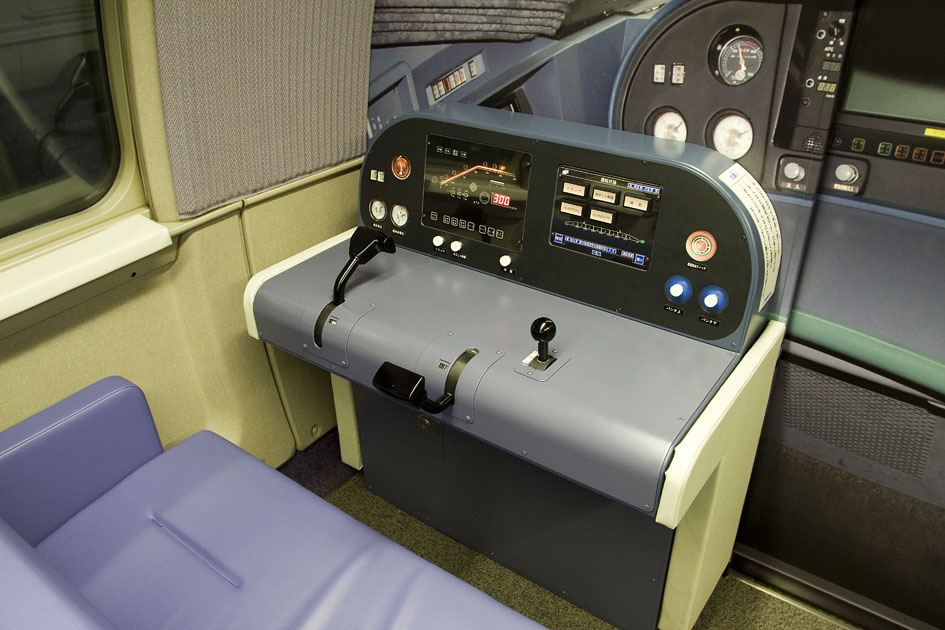
Mock-up of the driver's cab in an 8-car 500 series trainset

== Future plans ==
In announcement made on 14 February 2024, JR West outlined plans to retire four of the six remaining 500 series sets from revenue service by the end of 2026. The plan is to shorten four existing 16-car N700 series sets into eight-car sets to replace the 500 series sets. On 24 July 2024, JR West announced plans to retire the last two 500 series sets by 2027. On 22 June 2026, JR West announced that the last sets would end commercial operation on 13 January 2027, with complete retirement happening later in July that year.

== Special liveries ==
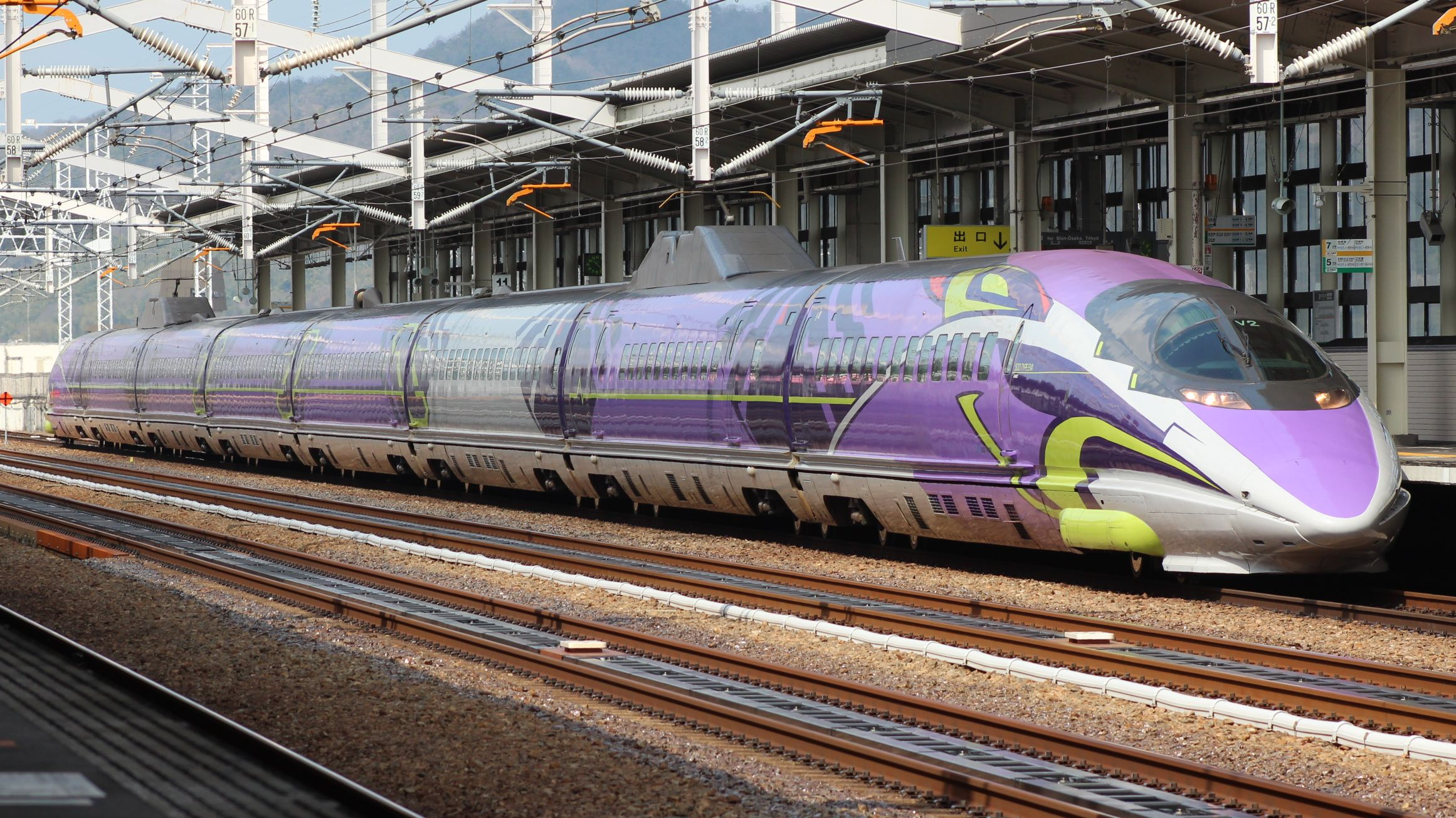
Set V2 in the special "500 Type Eva" livery in March 2016

=== 500 Type Eva ===
On 7 November 2015, set V2 began operating in a special "500 Type Eva" livery as part of the "Shinkansen:Evangelion Project" tie-up project to mark the 40th anniversary of the Sanyo Shinkansen and the 20th anniversary of Neon Genesis Evangelion. Initially planned to operate until March 2017, this livery was extended until 13 May 2018. Set V2 was then transformed to the Hello Kitty Shinkansen in June 2018.

From 24 February until 7 May 2018, the 500 series car preserved at the Kyoto Railway Museum was exhibited in the "500 Type Eva" livery.

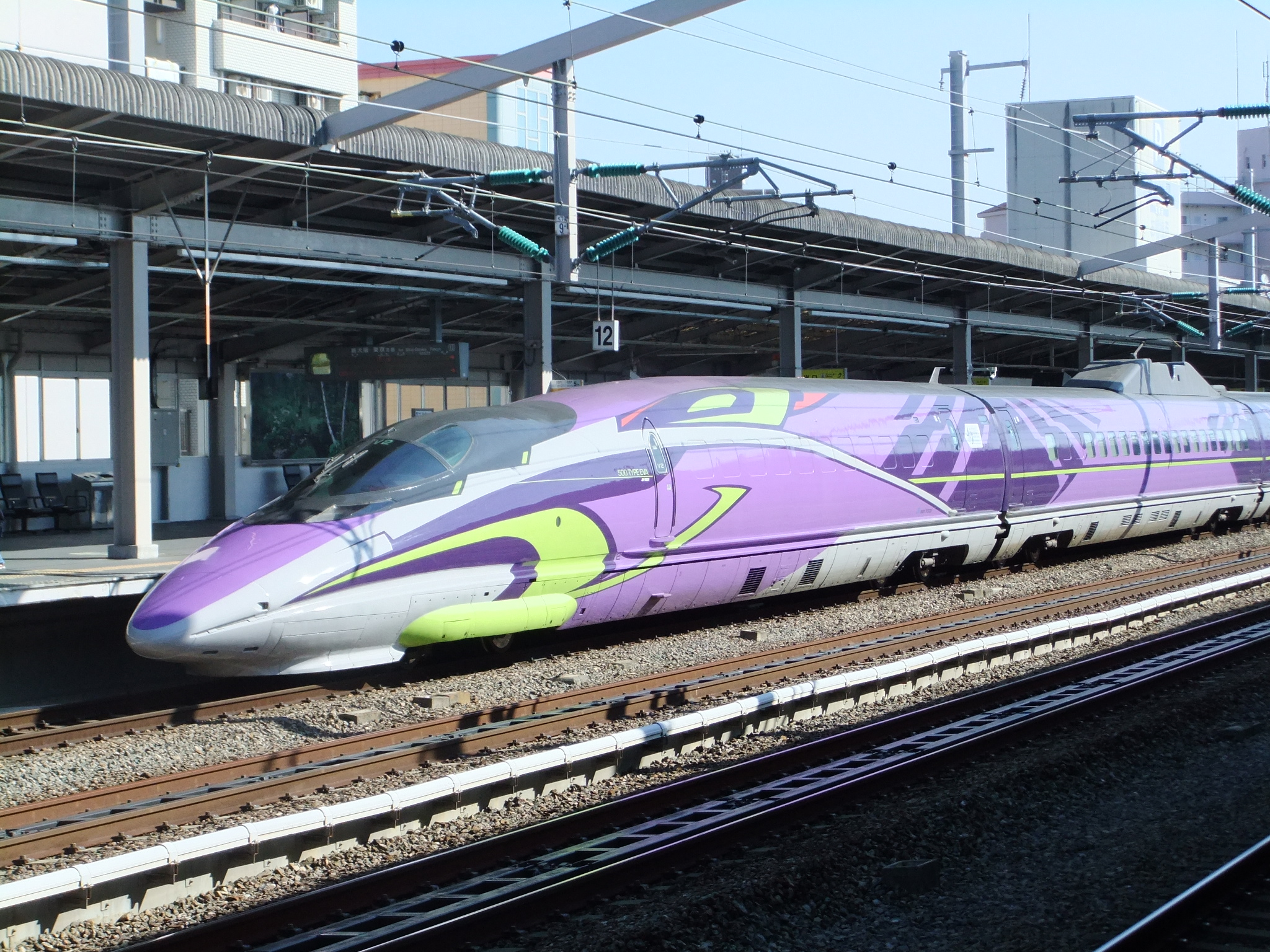
521-7002 (Car 1)

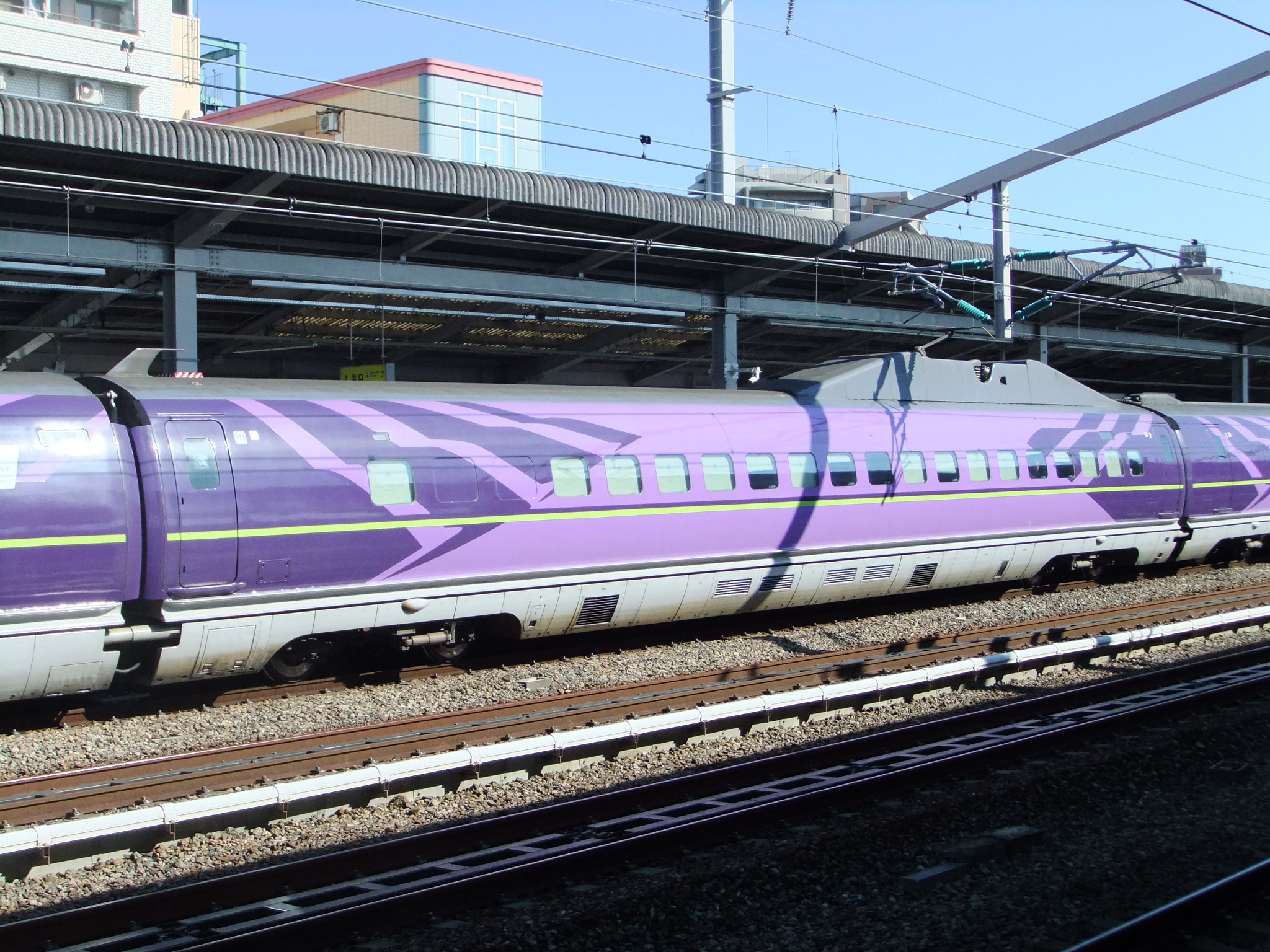
526-7004 (Car 2)

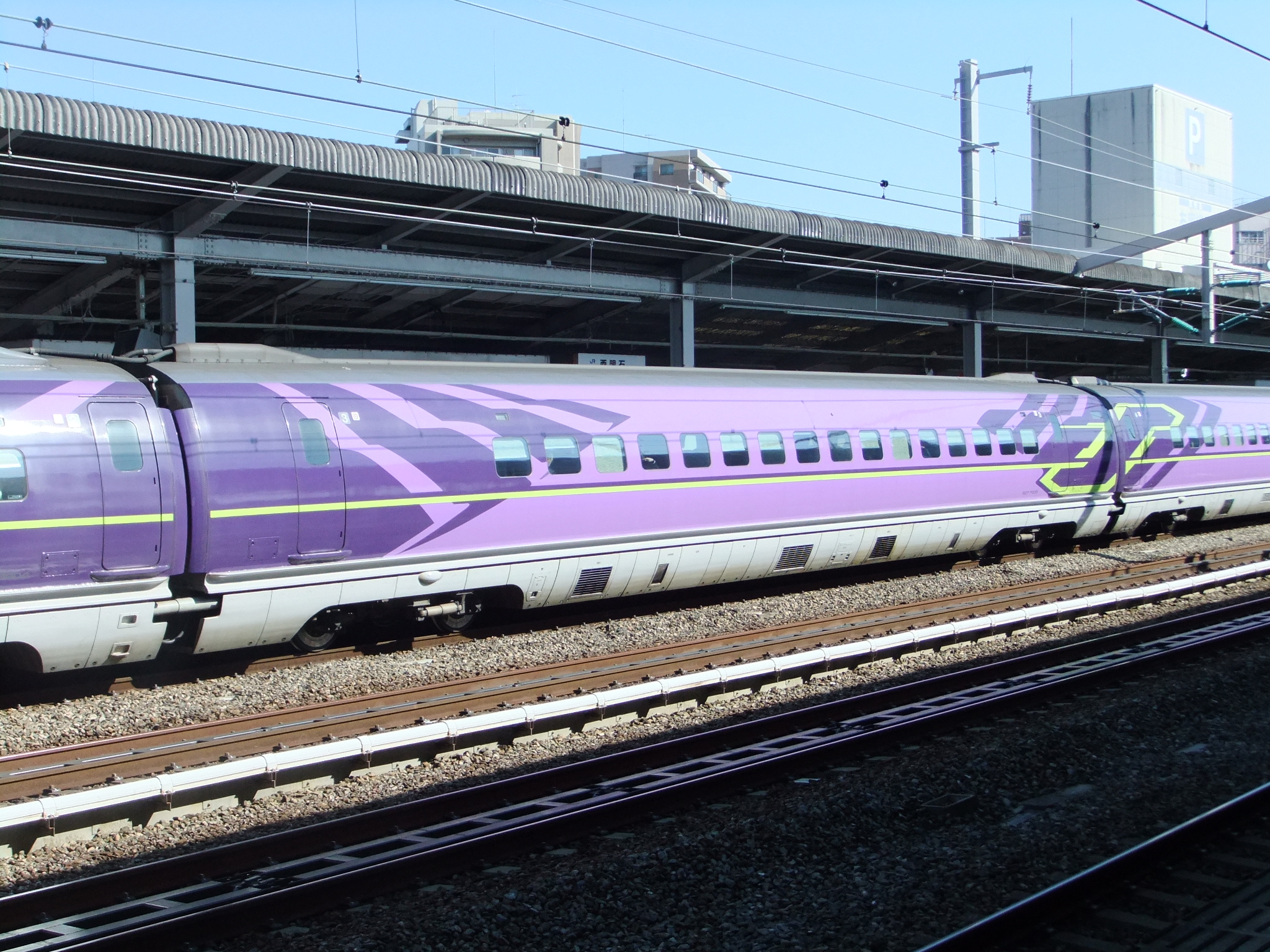
527-7003 (Car 3)

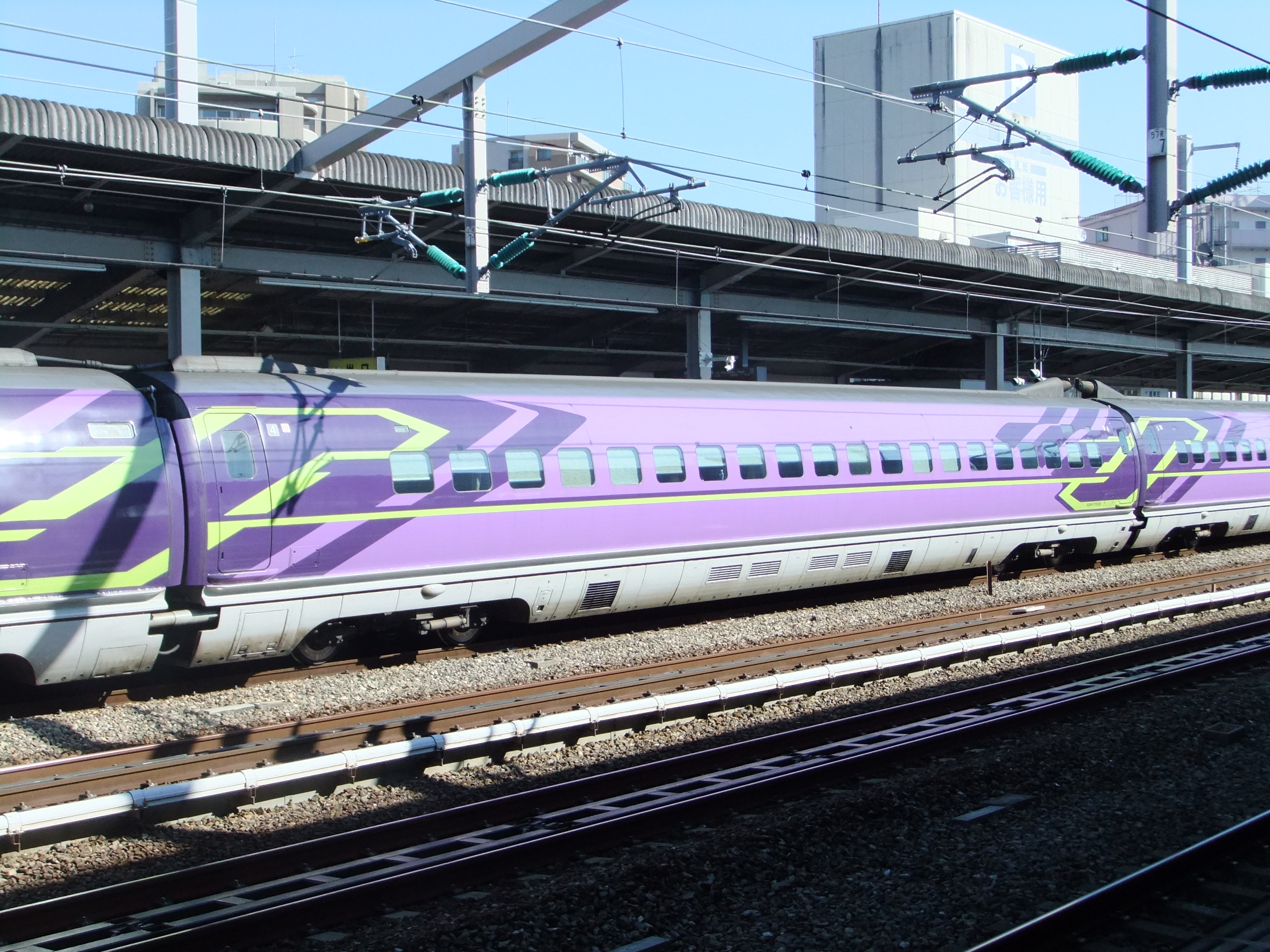
528-7002 (Car 4)

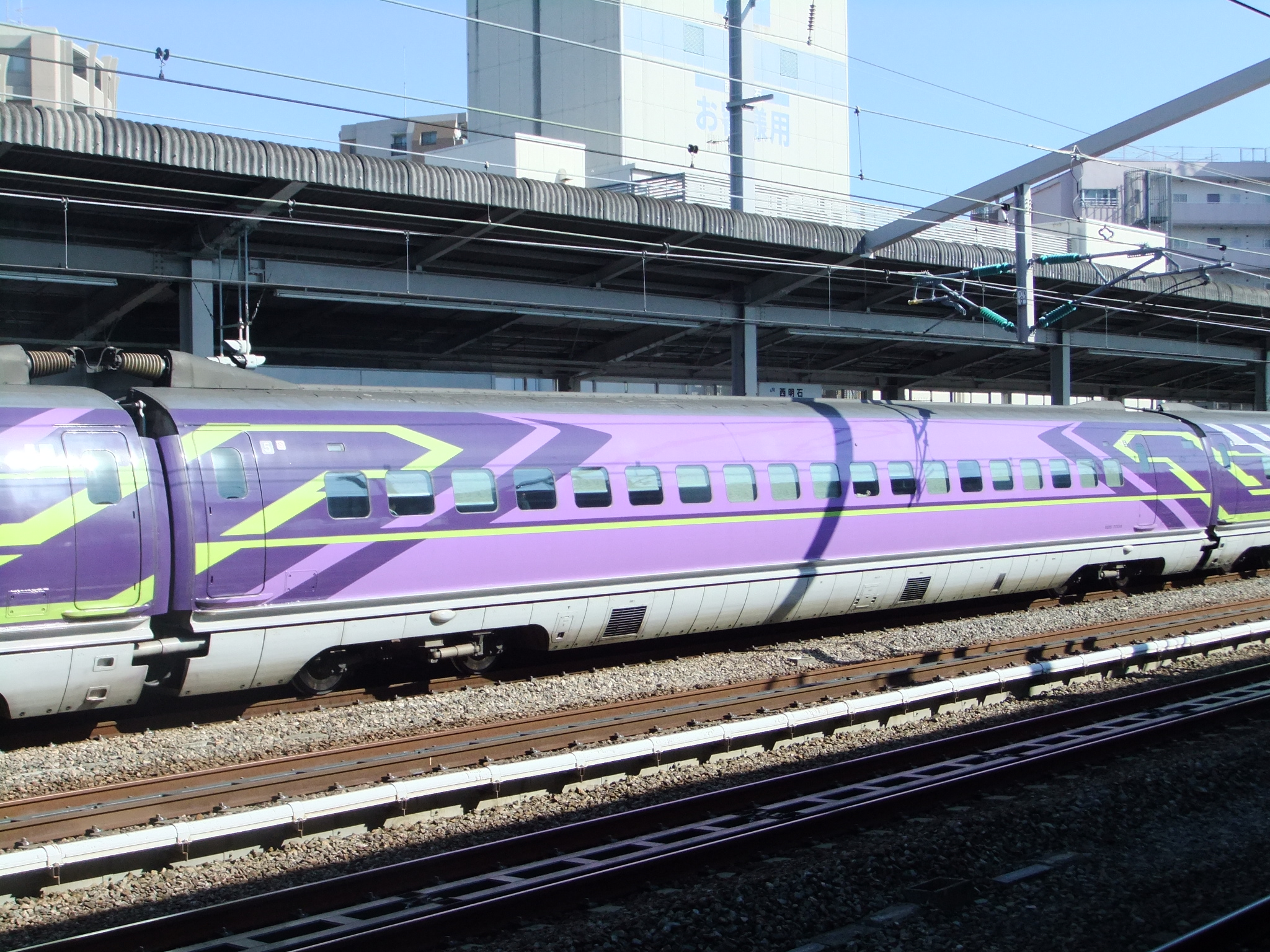
525-7004 (Car 5)

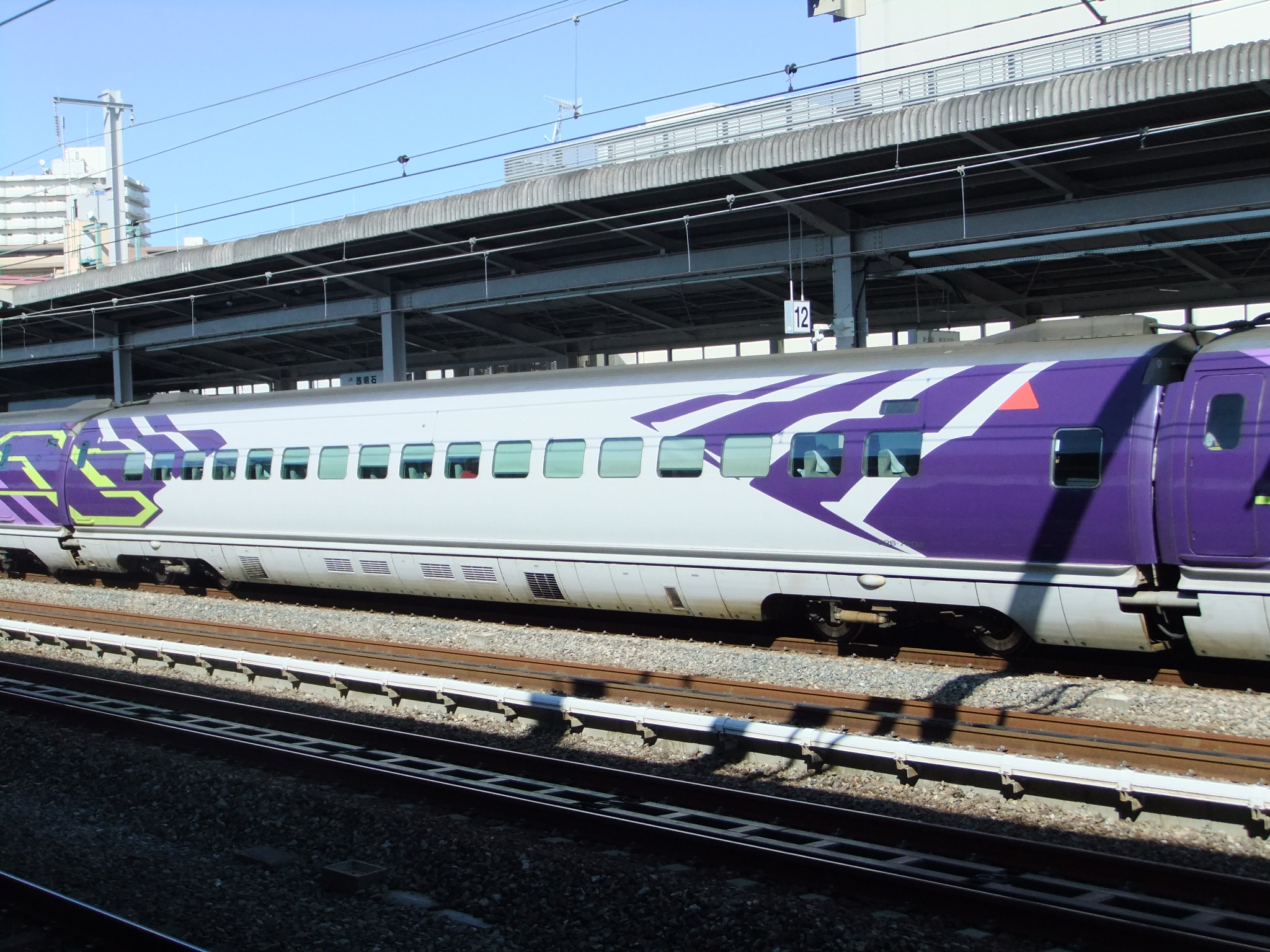
526-7202 (Car 6)

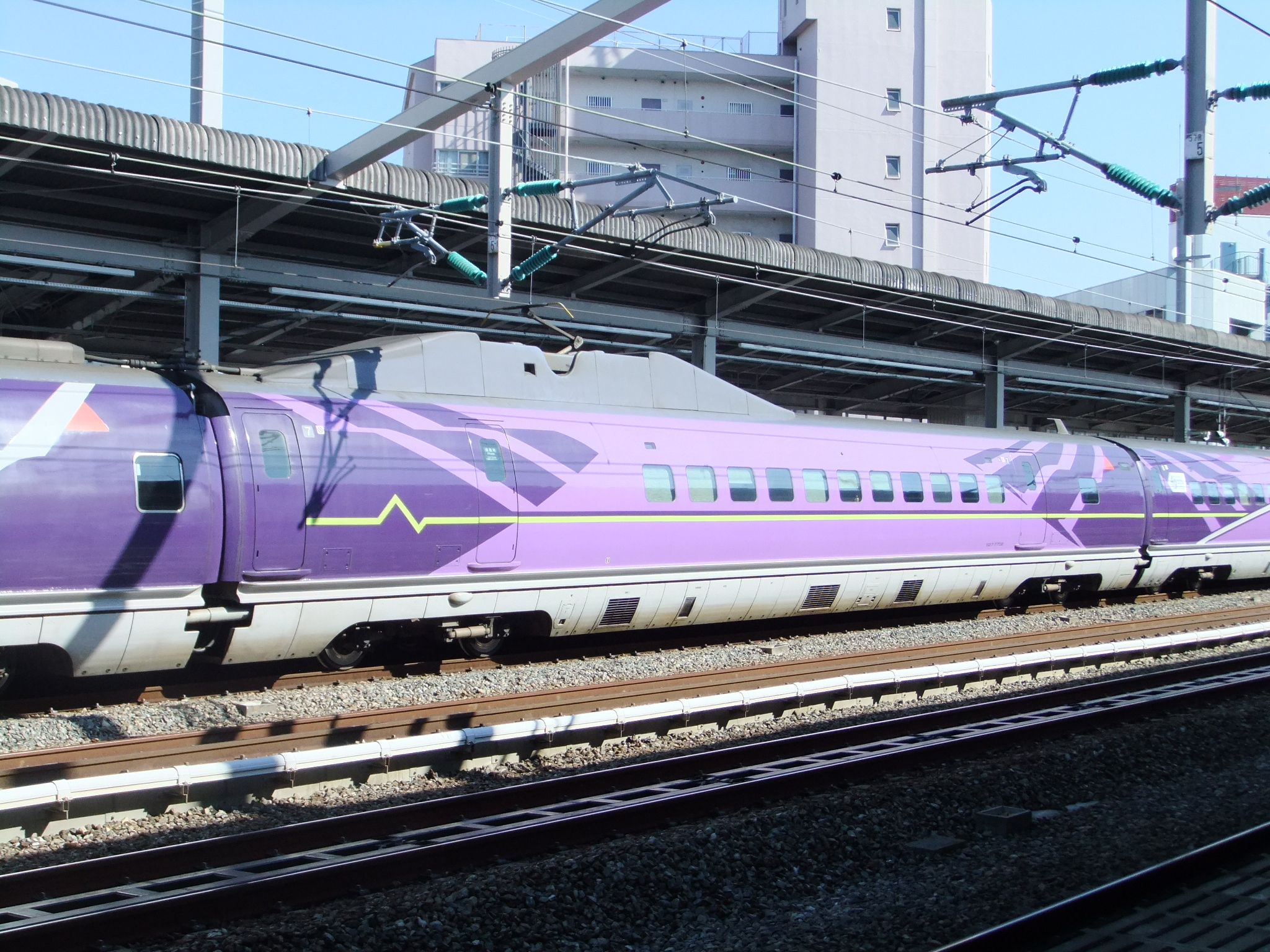
527-7702 (Car 7)

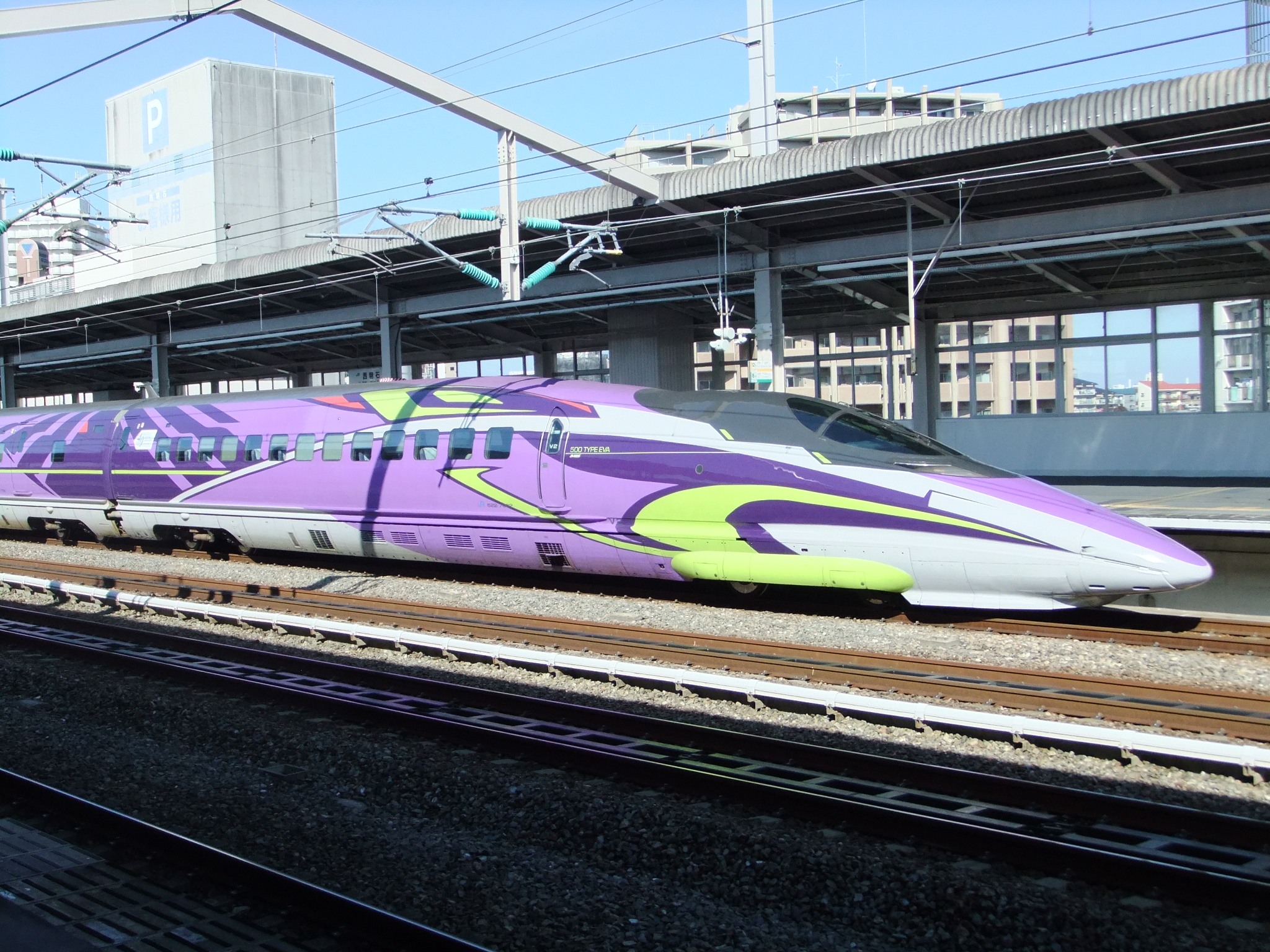
522-7002 (Car 8)

==== Interior ====
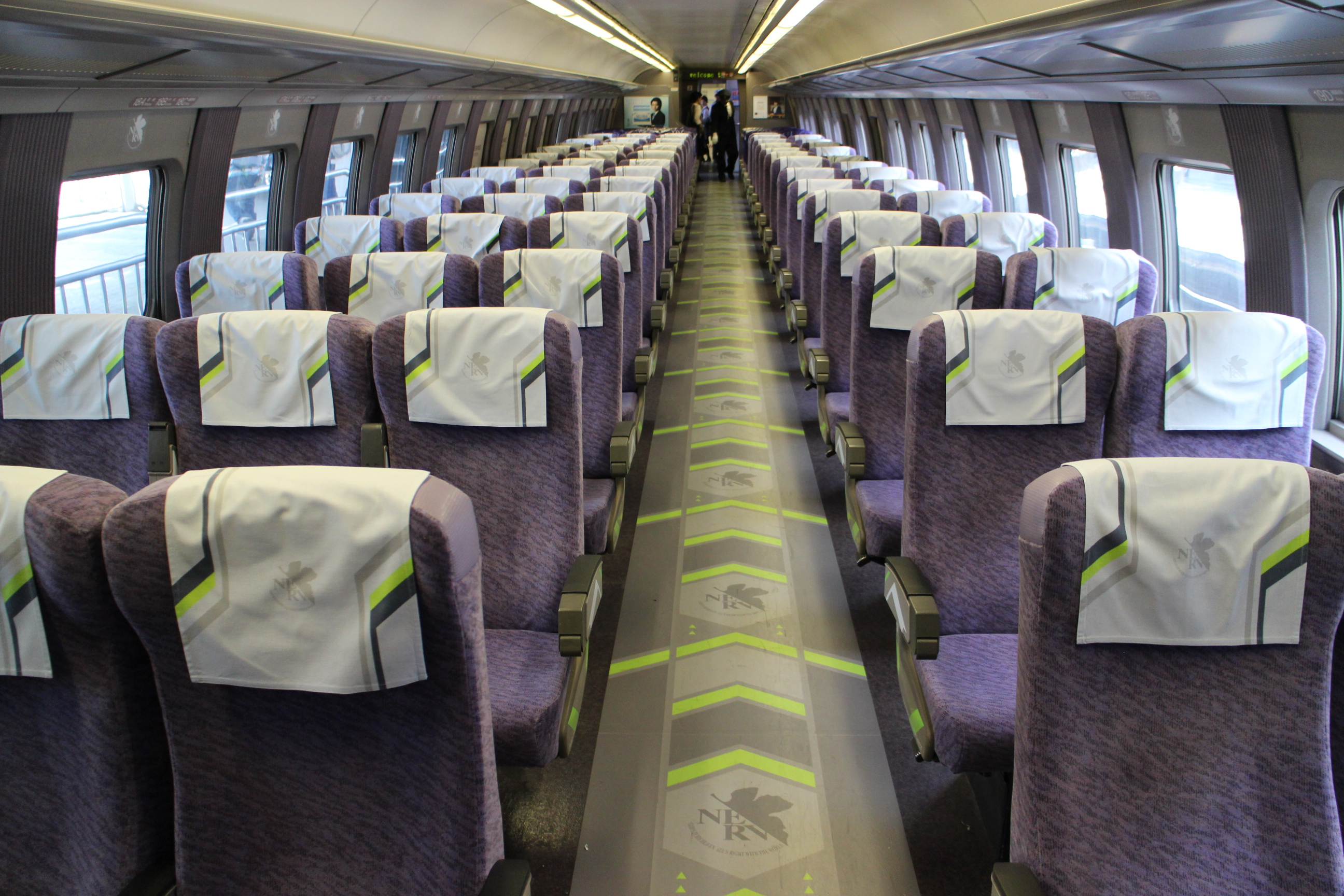
The interior of car 2 in March 2016

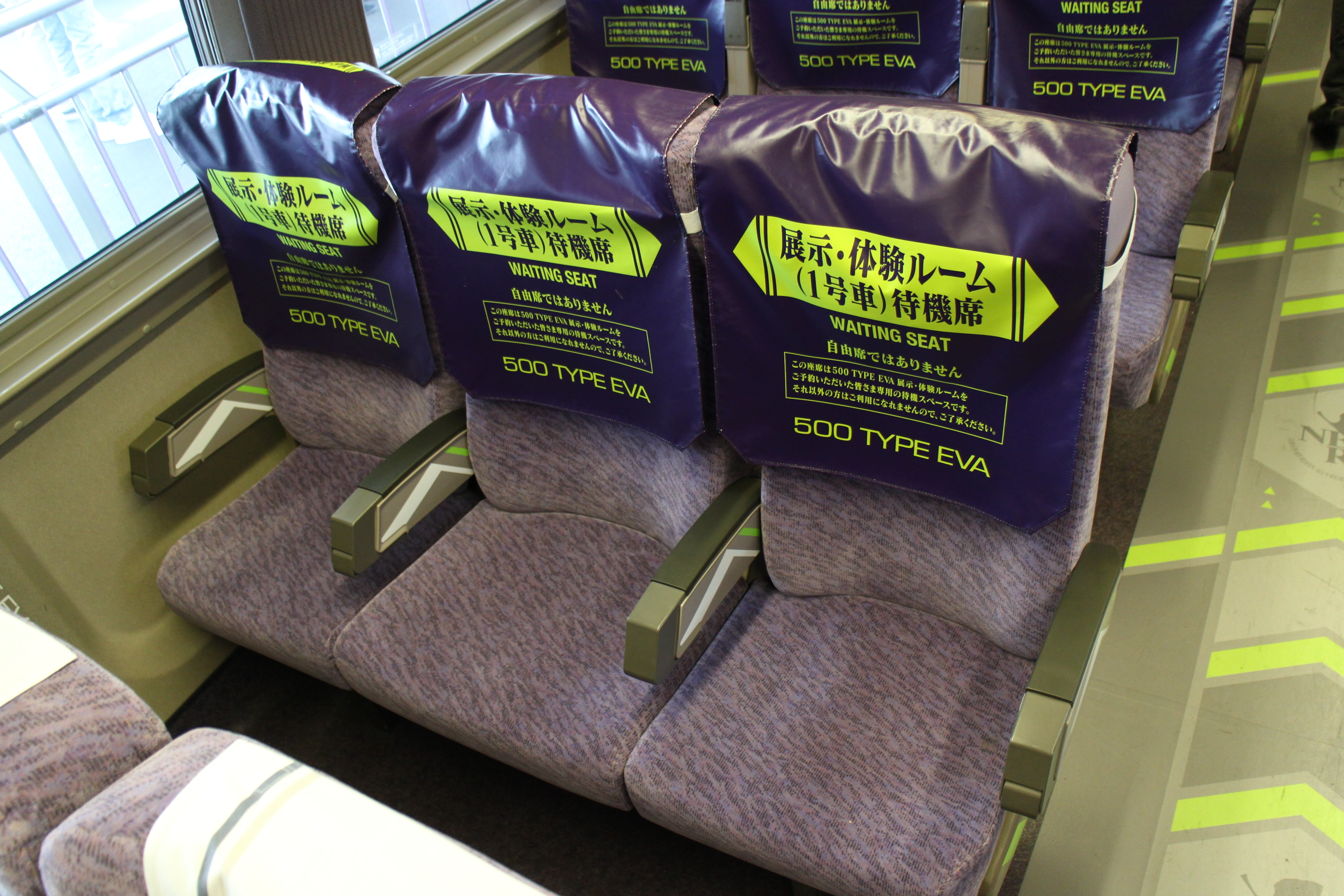
Seats in car 2 designated for passengers waiting to use car 1

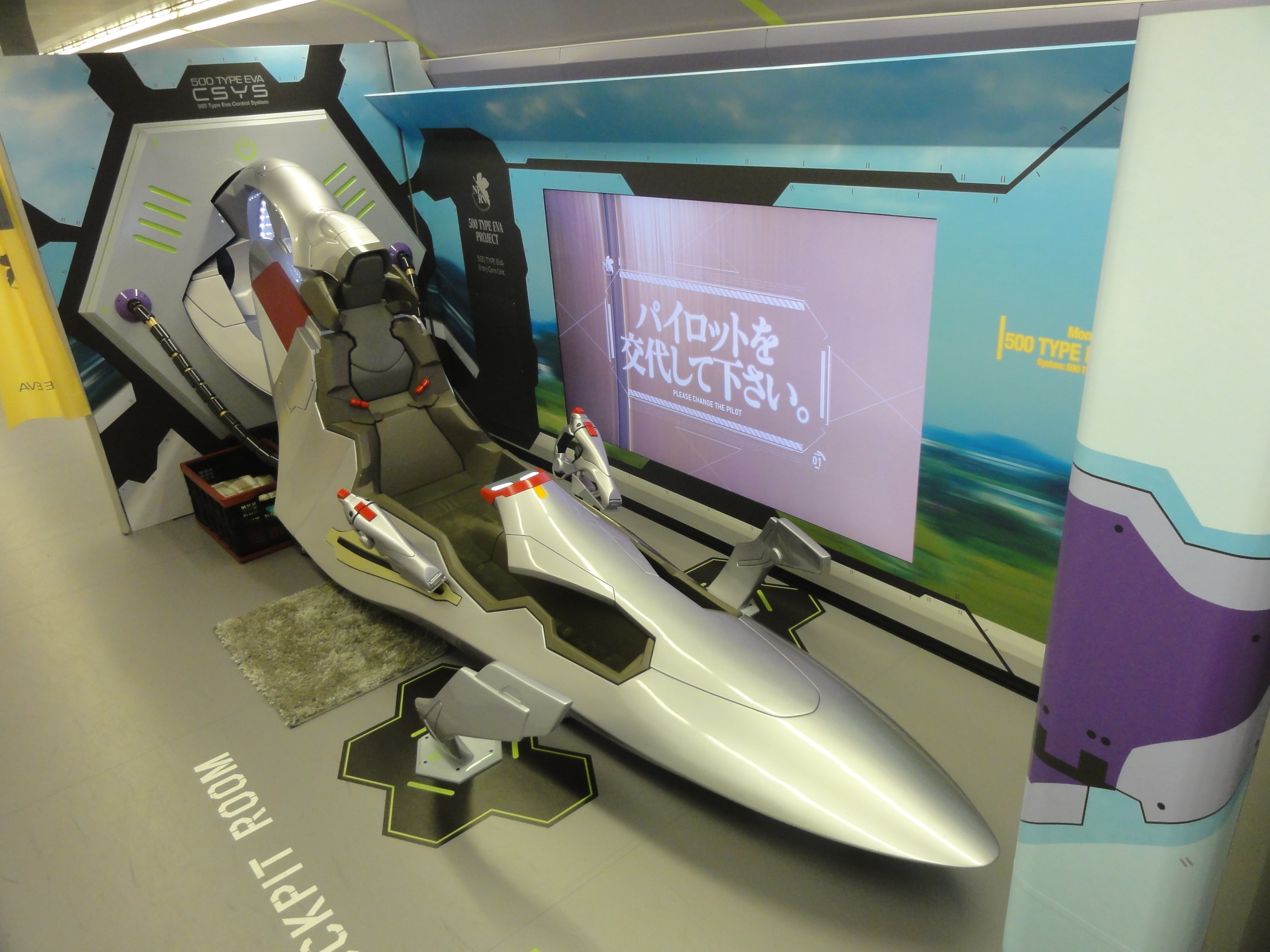
The Evangelion cockpit mockup in car 1

=== Hello Kitty ===
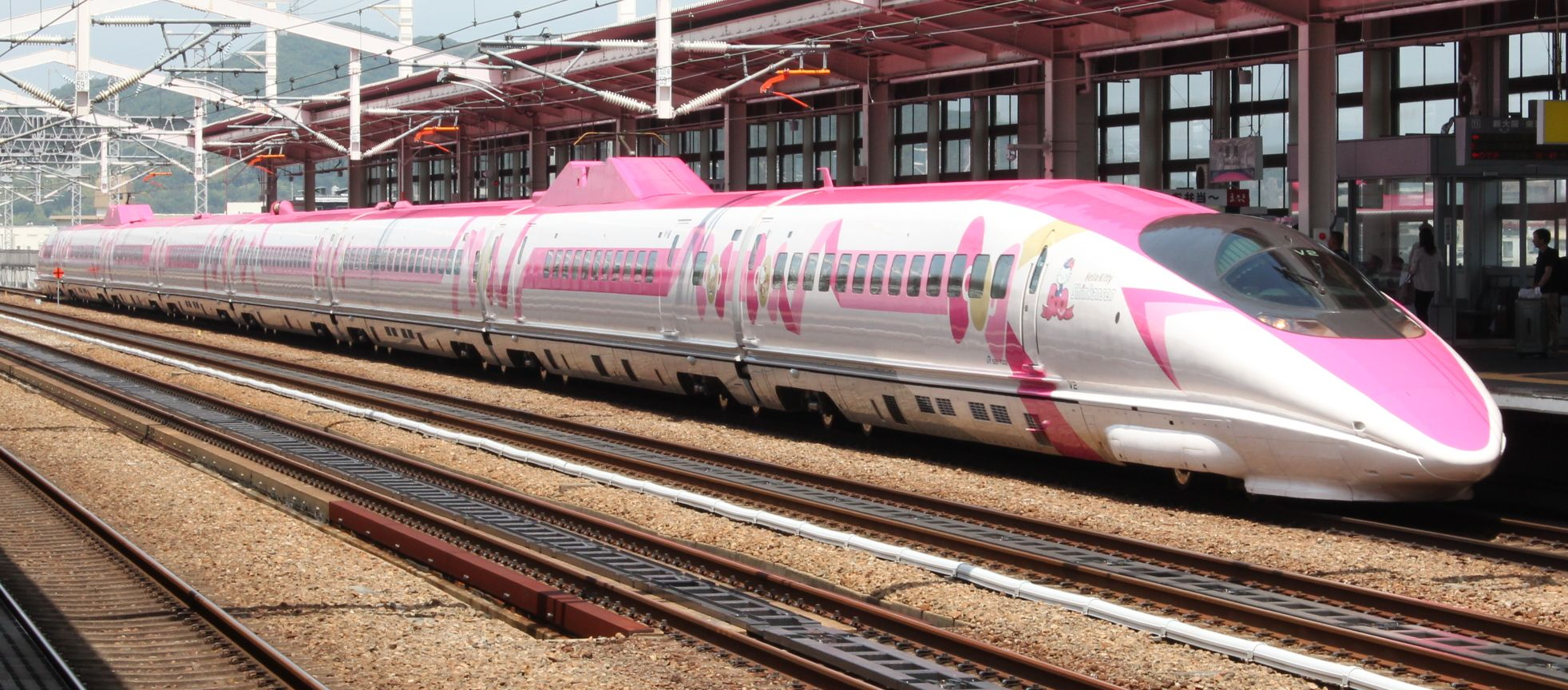
Set V2 in "Hello Kitty" livery in July 2018

In March 2018, JR West announced the launch of a special "Hello Kitty" themed 500 series train on Sanyo Shinkansen Kodama services. The train, set V2 which formerly ran in the "500 Type Eva" livery, entered service on 30 June 2018. It is scheduled to operate until the middle of 2026. On 16 January 2026, JR West announced that the last day of the "Hello Kitty" Shinkansen will take place on 17 May of that year.

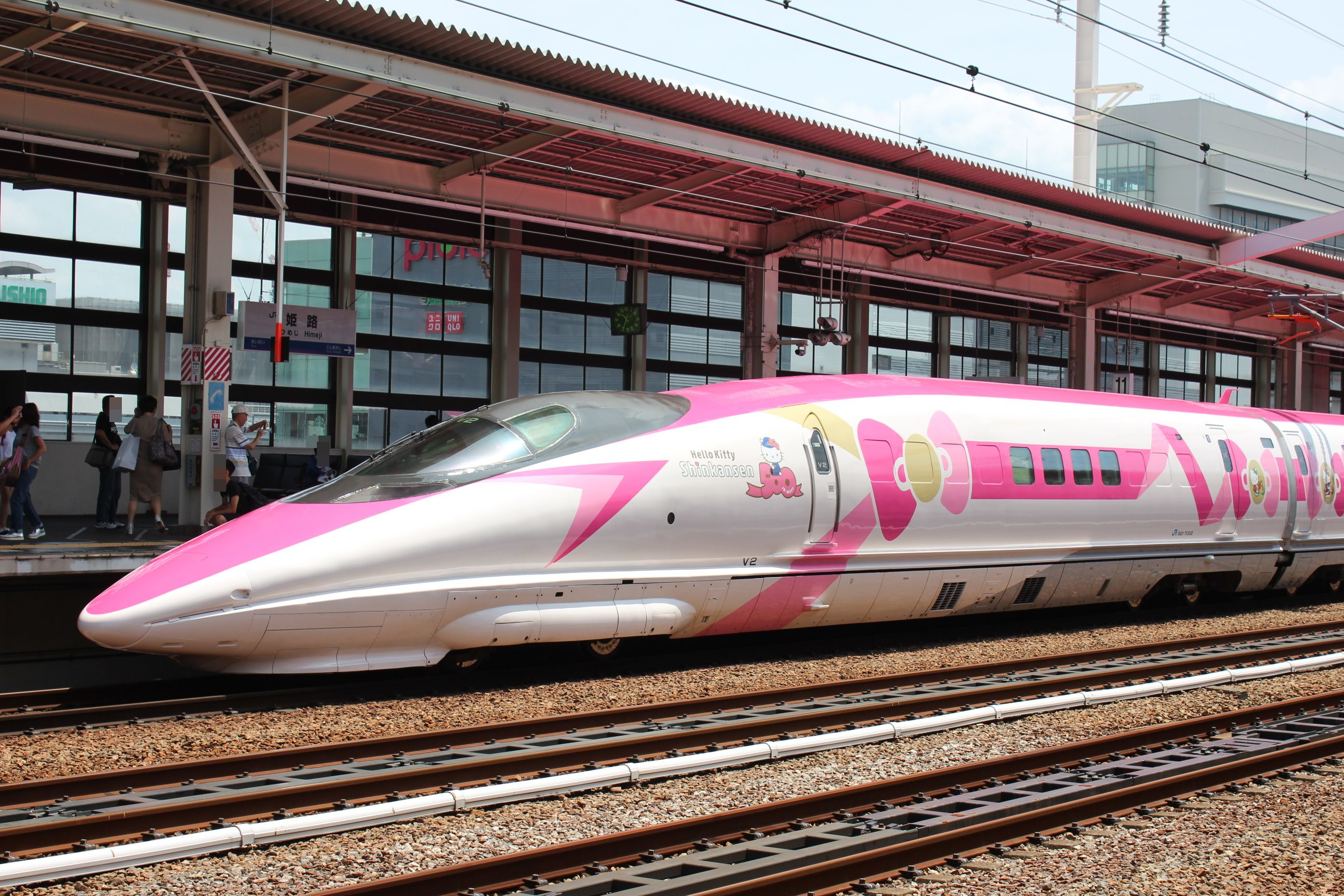
521-7002 (Car 1)

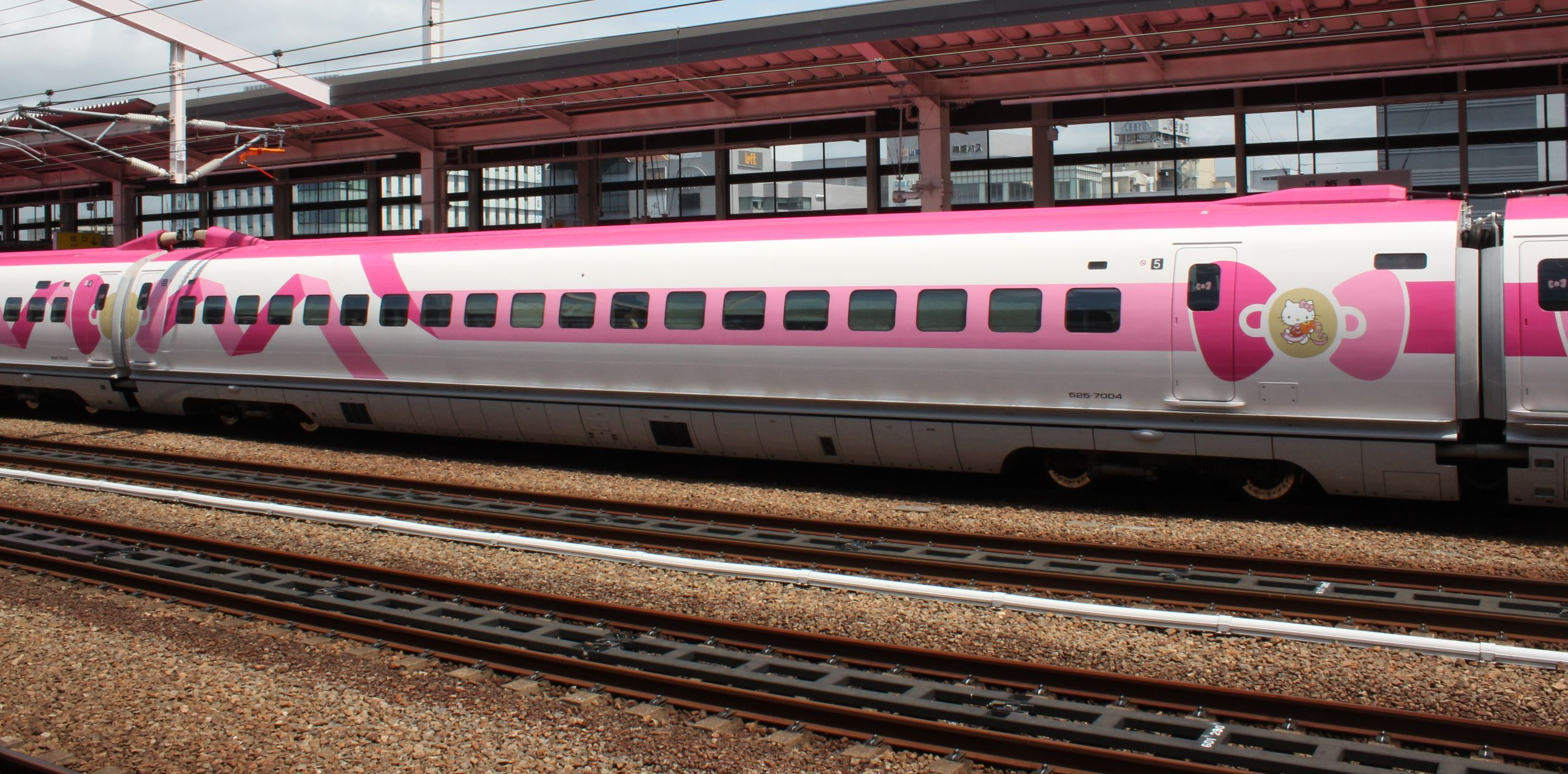
526-7004 (Car 2)

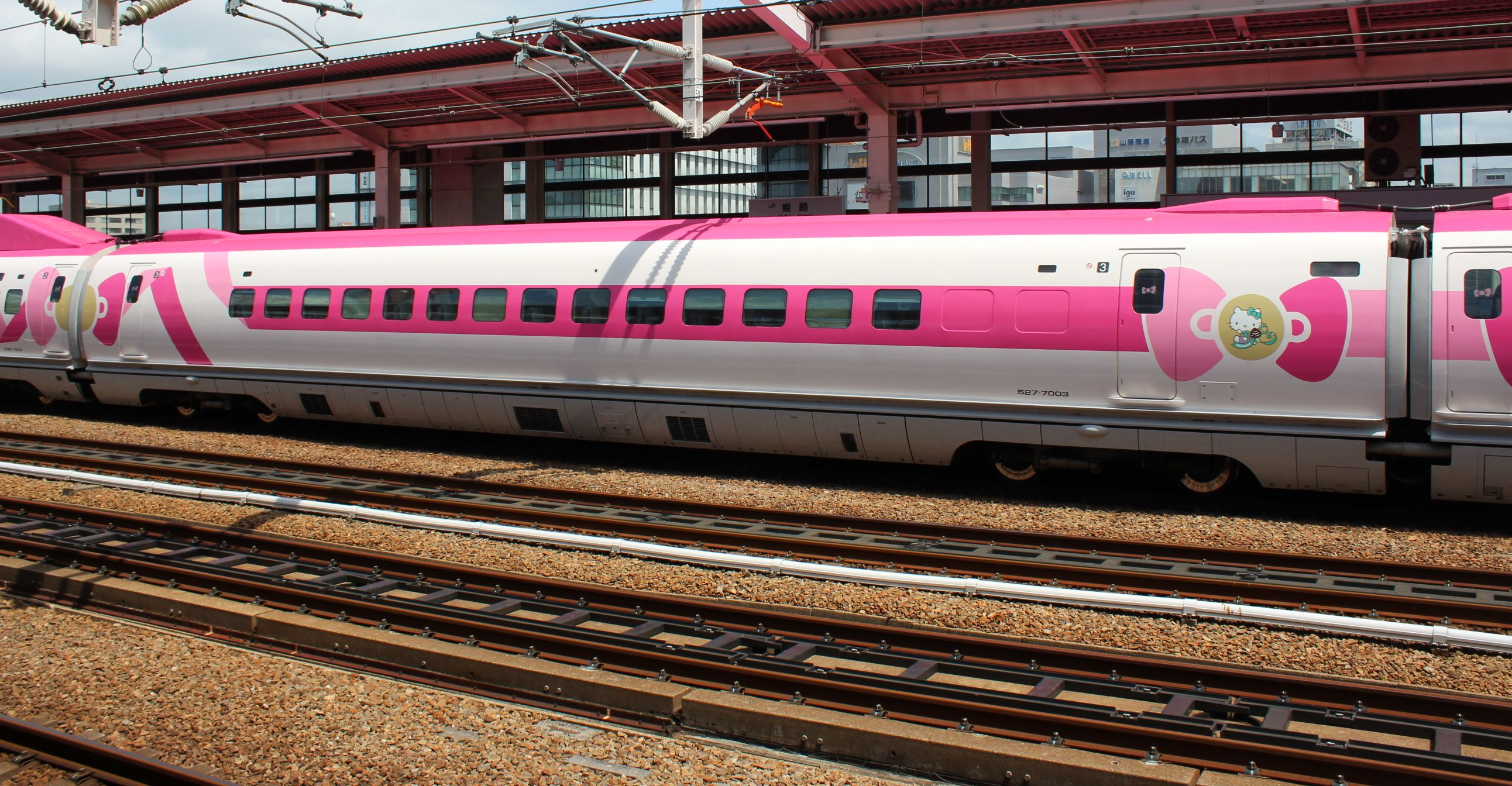
527-7003 (Car 3)

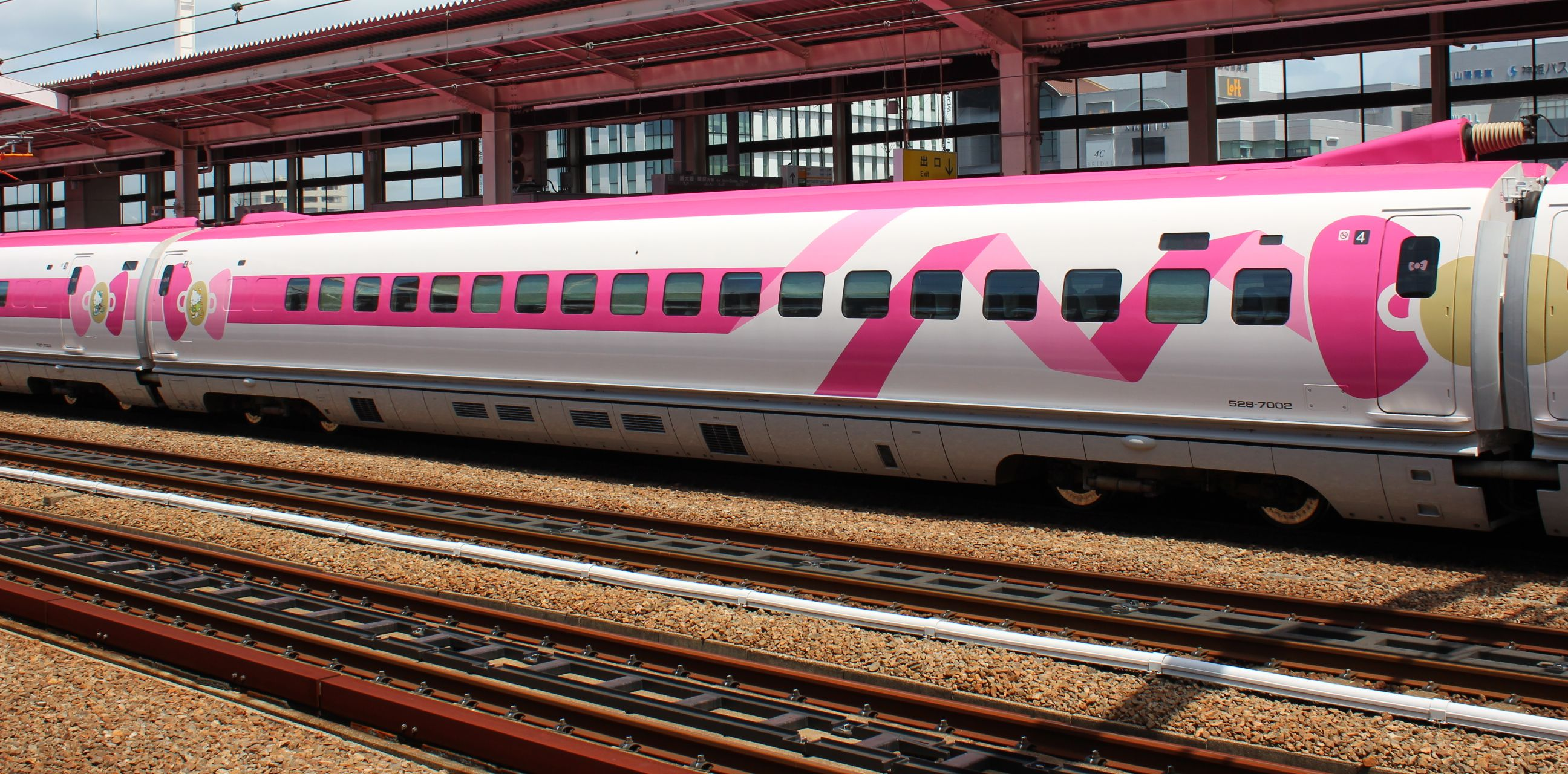
528-7002 (Car 4)

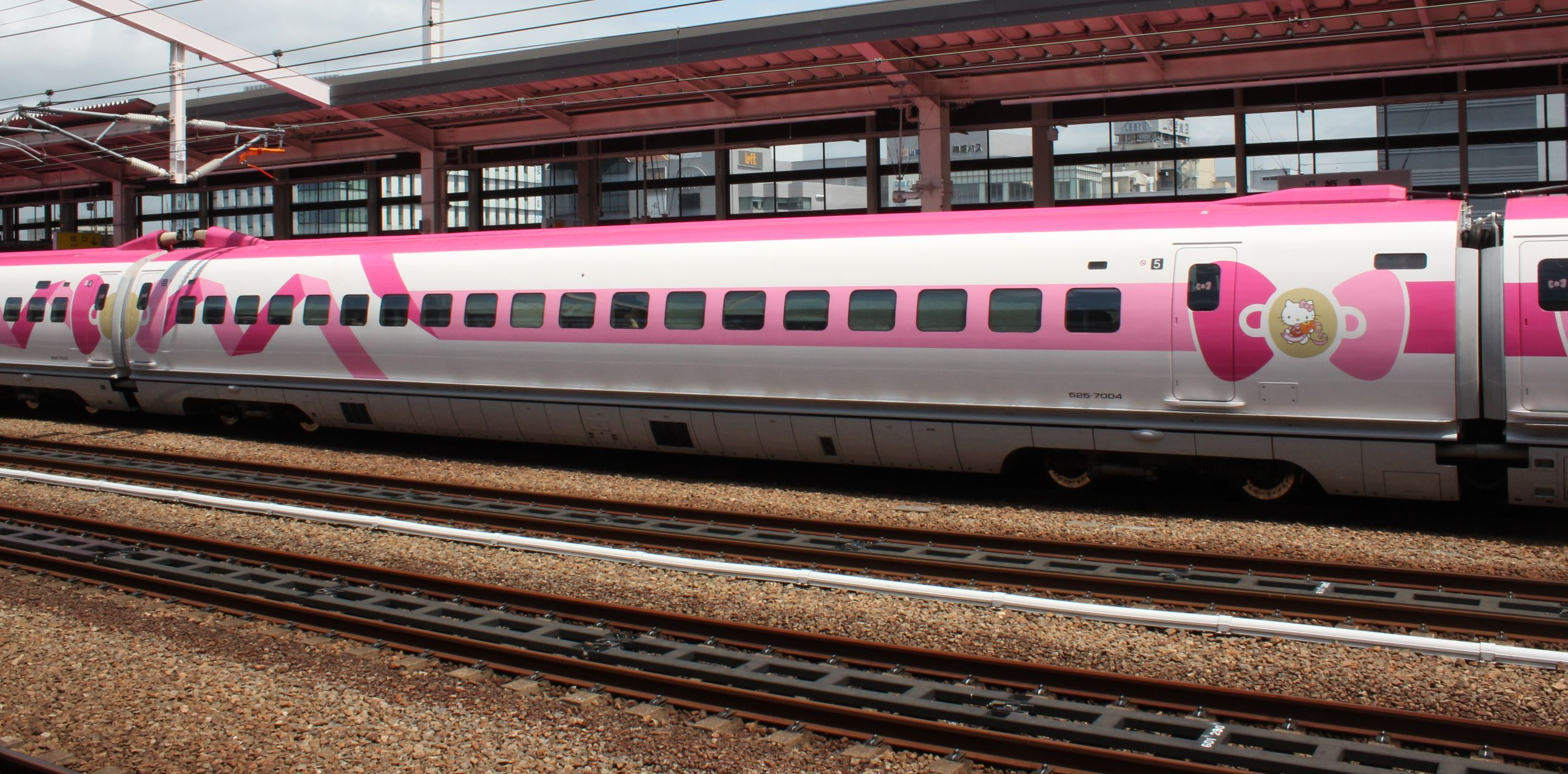
525-7004 (Car 5)

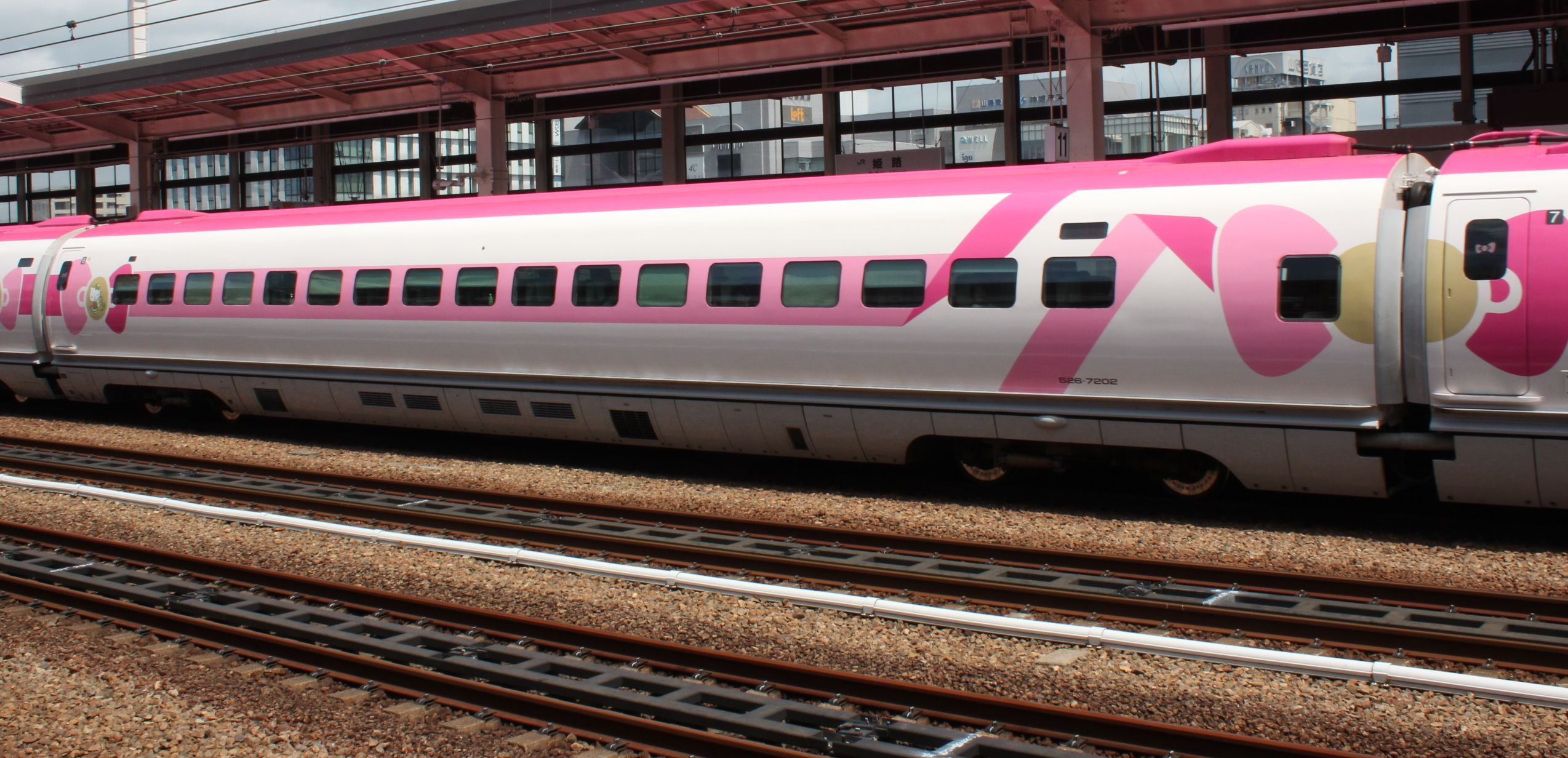
526-7202 (Car 6)

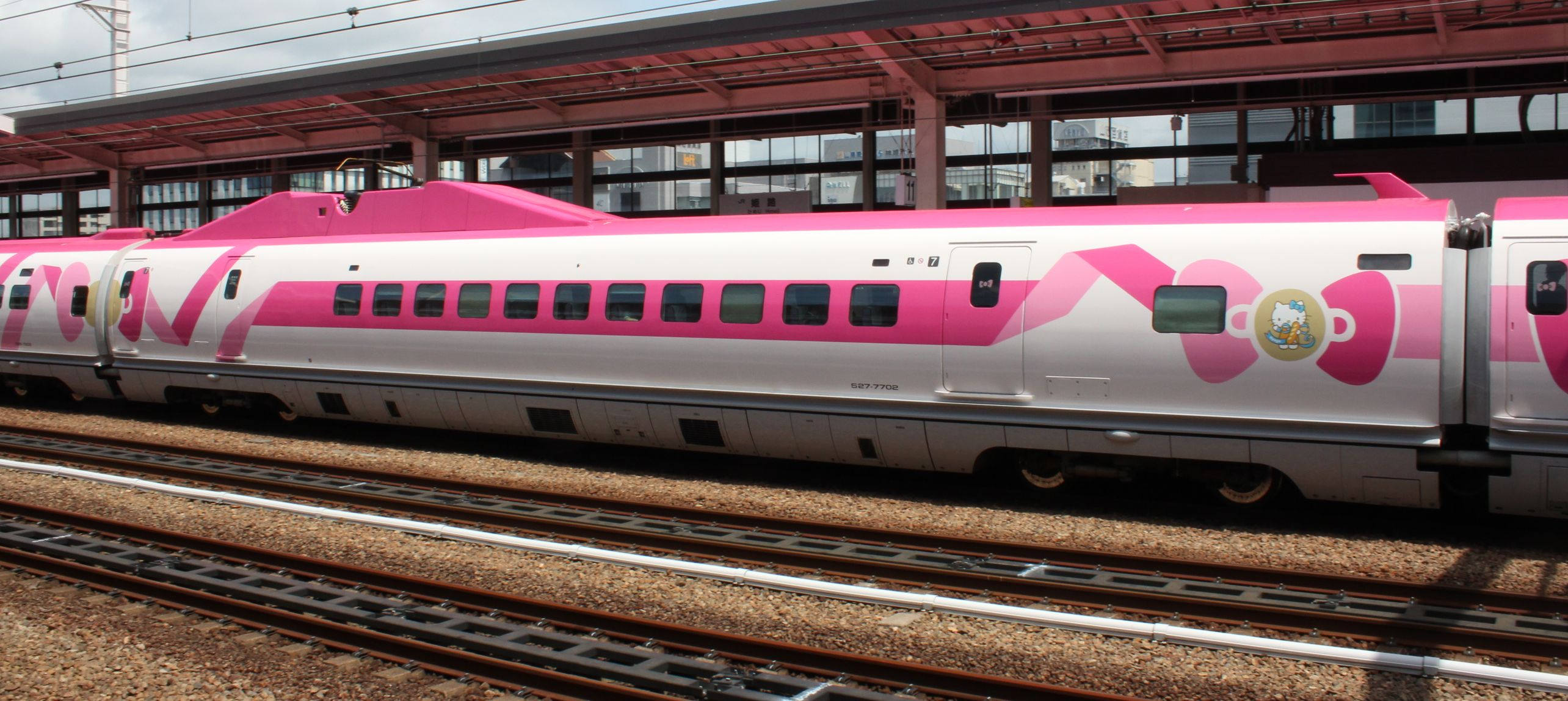
527-7702 (Car 7)

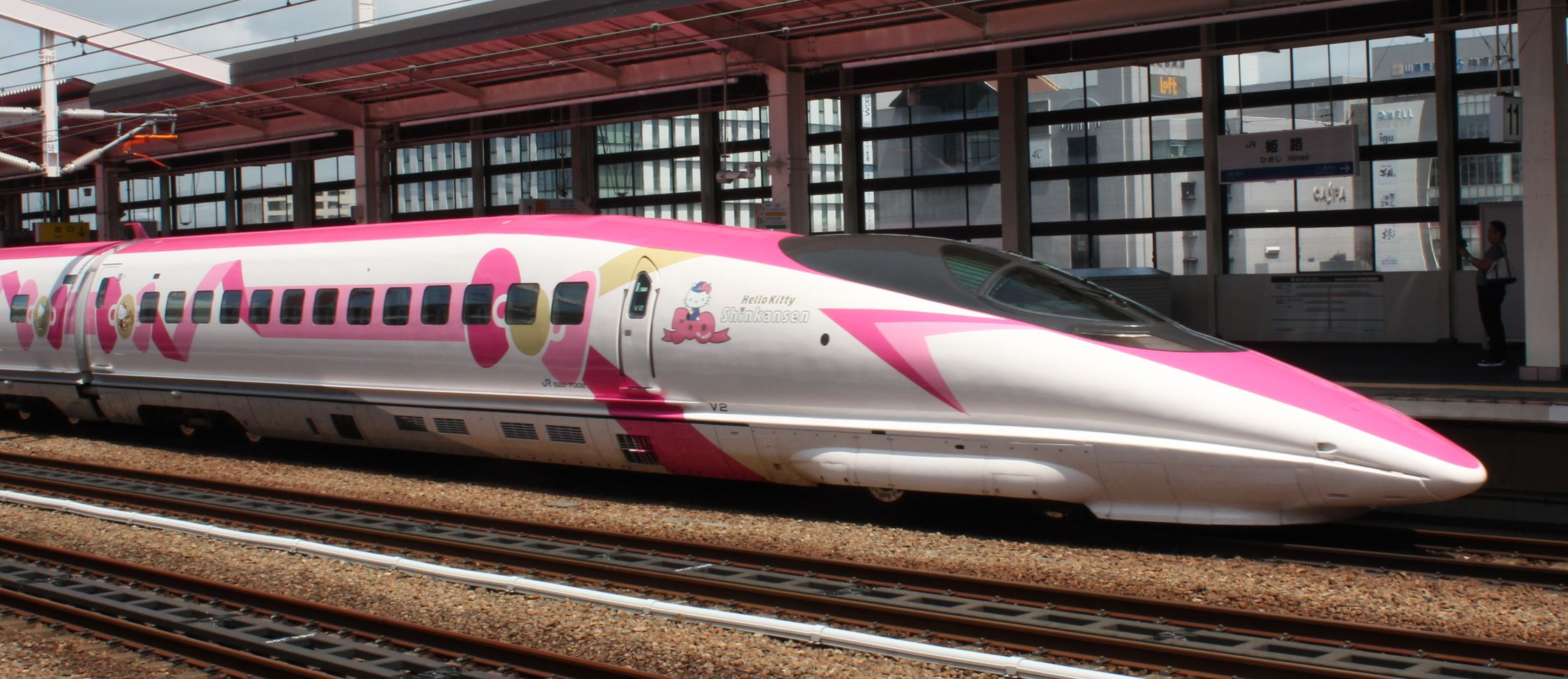
522-7002 (Car 8)

== Preserved examples ==
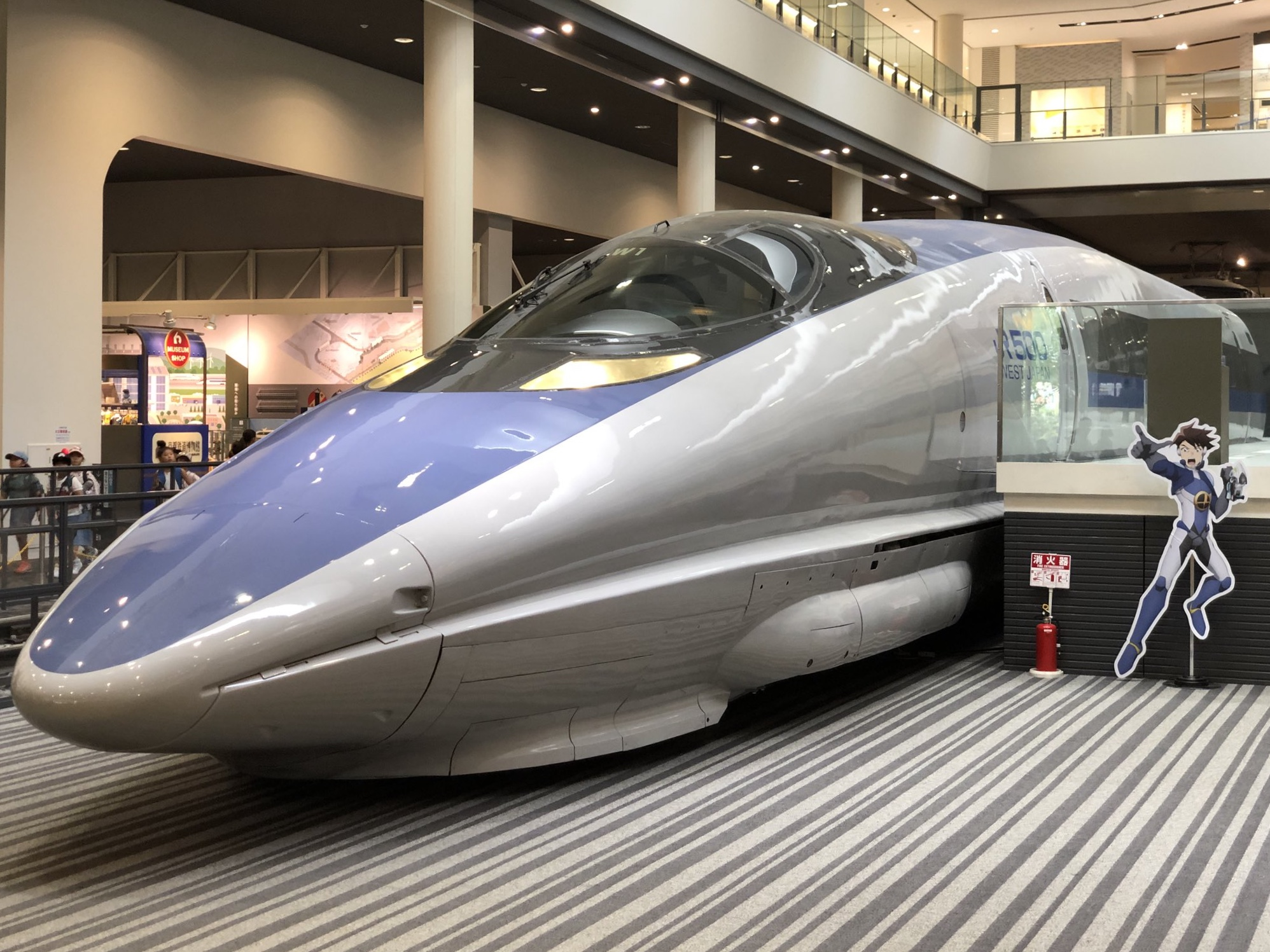
Car 521–1 at the Kyoto Railway Museum in August 2018

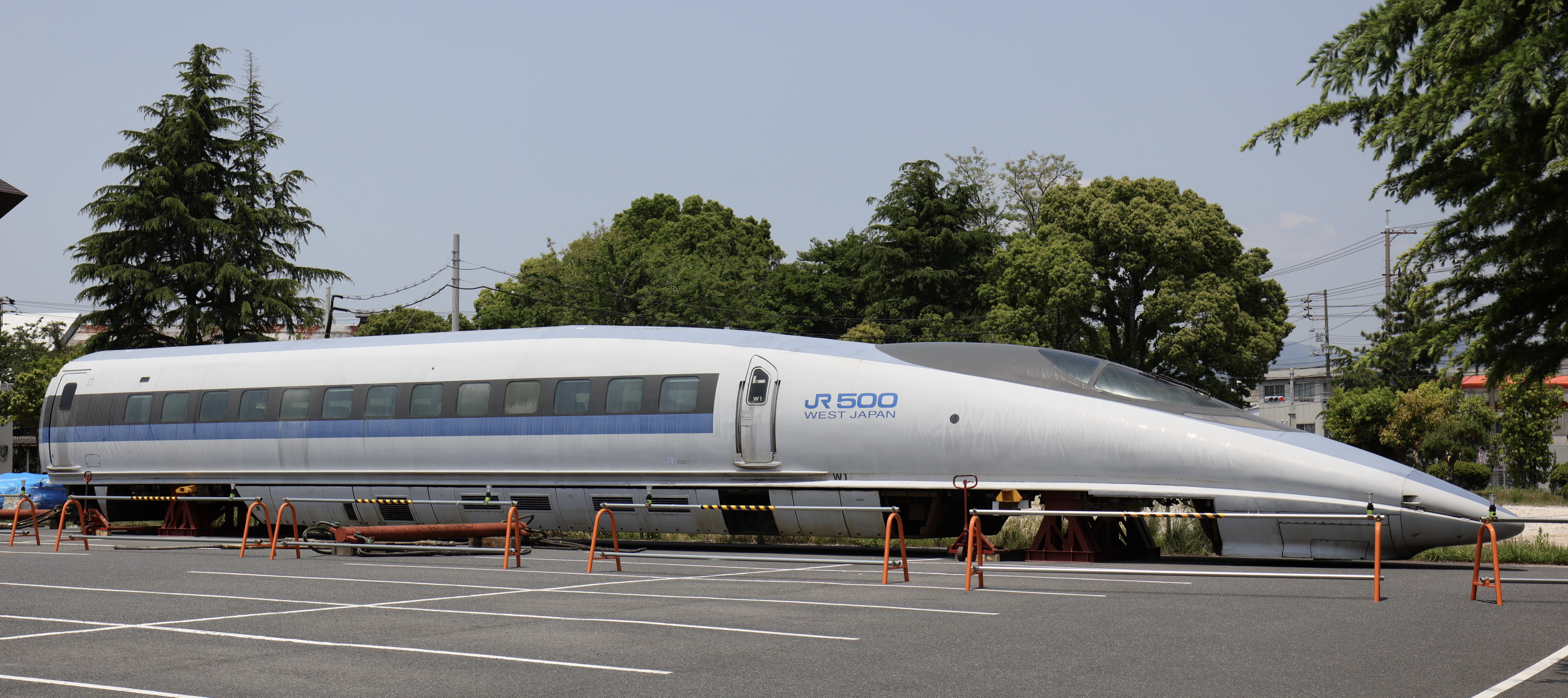
Car 522–1 at the Hitachi Kasado factory

As of 2023, two 500 Series cars have been preserved, both from the same set. Car 521–1, formerly the front car of set W1, is preserved at the Kyoto Railway Museum, which opened in April 2016. This car was exhibited in the "500 Type Eva" livery between 24 February and 7 May 2018. Car 522–1, formerly the end car of set W1, is preserved at the Hitachi Rail Kasado factory in Kudamatsu, Yamaguchi, in Autumn 2015.

== In popular culture ==
The 500 Series Shinkansen served as basis for Liner Gao in Japanese mecha anime series The King of Braves GaoGaiGar.

The Shinkansen Henkei Robo Shinkalion franchise would feature the 500 series as one of its many titular mecha. In addition to the standard livery, the Evangelion and Hello Kitty-wrapped versions also appeared in both the toyline and anime.

The anime Transformers: Robots in Disguise features the Autobot character Railspike, who transforms into a 500 Series Shinkansen.

== See also ==
- List of high speed trains
