= Series 6 =

Series 6 or Season 6 may refer to:

- Series 6 exam, officially the Investment Company Products or Variable Life Contracts Representative exam
- Apple Watch Series 6, a smartwatch produced by Apple
- BMW 6 Series
- GeForce 6 series, line of video cards

== See also ==
- 600 series (disambiguation)
- System 6

Preceded by Series 5 (disambiguation)	Series 6	Succeeded by Series 7 (disambiguation)
