= Baseball Register =

Almanac of baseball player statistics

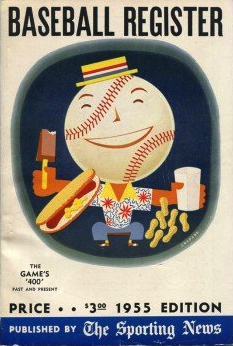
1955 edition

The Baseball Register, also known as the Official Baseball Register, was an annual almanac of baseball player statistics, published by The Sporting News. It was published in May after player changes had been made, at the start of the season. It ceased publication with its 2007 edition. In its first years of publication, from 1940 until 1965, it bore the subtitle "The Game's Four Hundred".
