= Chichibu Railway 500 series =

Class of 9 Japanese 2-car electric multiple units

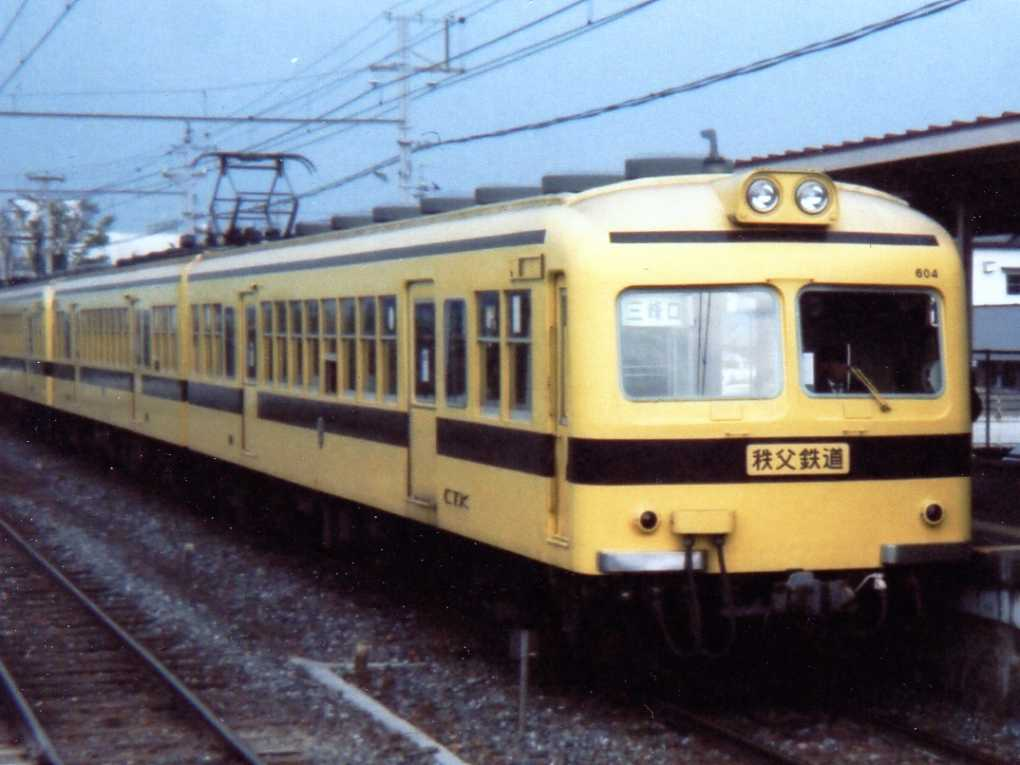
- 500 series at Omaeda Station, 1989
- In service: 1962–1992
- Number built: 18 vehicles (9 sets)
- Number scrapped: 18 vehicles
- Formation: 2 cars per trainset
- Operator: Chichibu Railway
- Line served: Chichibu Main Line

Specifications
- Car body construction: Steel
- Car length: 20 m
- Doors: 2 per side
- Electric system: 1,500 V DC
- Current collection: Overhead wire
- Track gauge: 1,067 mm (3 ft 6 in)

The Chichibu Railway 500 series (秩父鉄道500系) was an electric multiple unit (EMU) train type for local services on the Chichibu Main Line operated by the Chichibu Railway in Japan between 1962 and 1992.

== Formation ==
The trains were formed as follows.

- DeHa 500 + KuHa 600

== Interior ==
While based on the earlier 300 series express design, these sets had longitudinal seating. The KuHa 600 cars were originally fitted with a toilet, but these were later removed.

== History ==
Nine 2-car trains were built in 1962. The trains were replaced by 2000 series EMUs from 1991 and withdrawn by 1992.

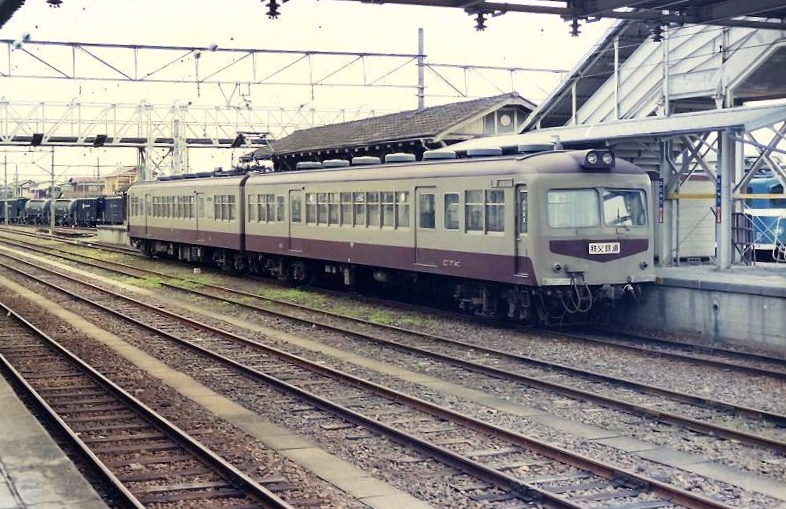
500 series set in original livery, 1984
