= 600 series connector =

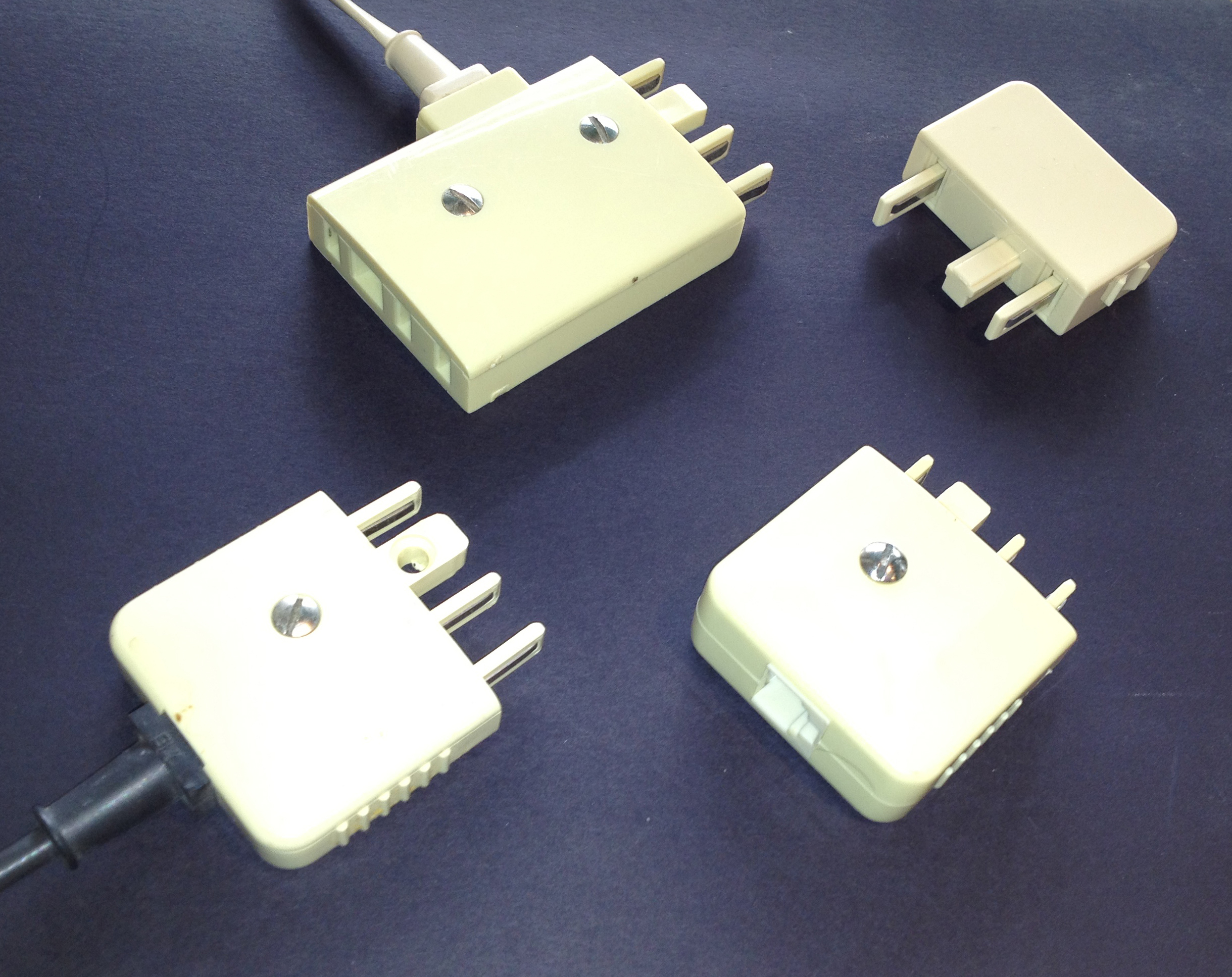
600 series connectors

A 600 series connector is an obsolete three-pin connector with up to six conductors.

It was for many years the standard telephone service connector in Australia, used on rural party lines and the national Postmaster-General's Department (later Telstra) landline network, but has since the 1970s been superseded by the six position modular connector in this application. As of 2008 a large installed base remained and a large variety of connectors, adapters and equipment such as ADSL filters were still in production and readily available.

It has no other common or standard use, either within Australia or beyond. However it is manufactured in other countries, usually in China, for export to Australia.

The 600 series plug has up to three flat pins plus a non-conducting spigot, which ensures correctly oriented insertion. Each pin carries up to two conductors by means of two contacts, one on each side of the pin. The pin bodies are of a non-conductive plastic material.

== Varieties ==
The original series 600 plugs and sockets were designed to be equally suitable for fixed wall mounting or for use on flexible cords. Such connectors are still available, but specialised fixed and line versions also exist.

=== 605 plug ===
Standard three pin six conductor. Often now replaced by a modular 6P2C connector and an adaptor; In particular, this combination is now the most common connector supplied with new equipment in Australia.

The non-conducting spigot of the original 605 plug was provided with a hole for a countersunk screw, allowing the plug to be fixed in a wall-mounted socket. Removal then required first removing the socket cover, to allow this retaining screw to be removed. In this way a semi-permanent connection, requiring tools for disconnection, could be achieved.

=== 610 socket ===
Standard six conductor.

The original 610 socket was provided with two mounting holes, one behind the receptacle for the plug spigot, and both for countersunk screws. This arrangement allowed the socket to be secured using two screws, with no plug inserted, or alternatively with the plug inserted, using the same two mounting holes but with one of the screws passing through the spigot to secure the plug as well.

=== 611 socket ===
Similar to 610, but with the contacts of pairs one and two allowed to connect when no plug is inserted, contact 1 connecting to 2 and 5 to 6.

This is particularly designed for mode 3 connection. The incoming line to the mode 3 device is connected using pair one, and pair two is used as the outgoing line to other devices. If the mode 3 device is unplugged, the switch contacts maintain line connection to the other devices.

This function is not generally supported by modular connectors. Modular connectors providing suitable switch contacts are available but not common; Instead, mode 3 devices use two modular connectors, one for the incoming line and the other for the outgoing line. The convenience of using a single connector in this application is one reason for the continued use of 600 series connectors, but mixing this wiring scheme with modular connectors does not work well. For example, if a modern modem with its supplied 6P2C adaptor is plugged into a conventionally wired 611 mode 3 socket, the result is to disconnect all downstream devices.

In some sockets conductors 3 and 4 also connect when no plug is present, shorting pair three. Sockets are also available with cams to allow the switching functions to be selectively enabled as required. In some older sockets this could be achieved by simply bending the contacts; The cams merely implement this useful accidental feature in an intentional fashion.

Many recent 611 sockets have a stepped recess for the plug spigot, to accept a plug with a larger spigot but still provide a good fit for a standard 605 plug. Equipment requiring mode 3 connection can then be equipped with these larger spigot plugs, to prevent this equipment being connected to a 610 socket which does not provide mode 3 support. These plugs are common on older fax machines and modems, and used on some security and similar equipment. These plugs were also used on Telex machines within Australia.

=== Other varieties ===
==== 60x plugs ====
In general, 60x where x is any numeric other than 0 or 5 indicates a non-standard plug. Compatibility and designs vary from maker to maker.

==== 61x sockets ====
In general, 61x where x is any numeric other than 0 or 1 indicates a non-standard socket. Compatibility and designs vary from maker to maker.

==== Extensions ====
Extension leads are generally four conductor, including pair one and one other pair, wired straight through pin to pin. Some incorporate an adaptor plug which includes a 610 socket, often with all six conductors connected, allowing the extension to also serve as a double adaptor.

==== Double adaptors ====
Double adaptors are almost always six conductor, wired pin to pin, with a 605 plug and two 610 sockets in parallel.

==== Mode 3 adaptors ====
A mode 3 adaptor appears physically to be a double adaptor, but the sockets are one 610 and one 611, with pair one of the 610 wired to pair two of the 611, and pair one of the 611 to pair one of the plug. Treatment of the other conductors varies, and may be assignable.

== Standard pinout ==
The conductors are numbered 1–6 from the end further from the spigot. The contact terminals are normally labelled with their numbers on rewireable plugs and sockets.

1. Pair 2 ring (black)
2. Pair 1 tip (white)
3. Pair 3 ring (green)
4. Pair 3 tip (orange)
5. Pair 2 tip (red)
6. Pair 1 ring (blue)

Use of pair one is almost always to standard, but pairs two and three may not be present, or the conductors may be used for other purposes. Pair two is often used for local power supply or other proprietary purposes. Adaptors to modular connectors may connect only pair one, or pairs one and two, or all six conductors.

Modems and other equipment supplied in Australia are nowadays normally provided with a modular plug, and an adaptor which connects only pair one, allowing the modular plug to be used with a 610 or 611 socket in need. The pin carrying pair three is often missing completely from the plugs of these adaptors.

=== Legacy colour codes ===
Legacy installations and equipment most often use either:

- Pairs one and two, connected using four core cable with blue, white, red and black conductors, either solid conductors as two unshielded twisted pairs or flexible untwisted four conductor cable.
- Pair one only, connected using two conductor cable with one white and one blue conductor, either as solid core UTP or flexible two core cable.

==== Wiring detail and explanation ====
In the early 1980s Telecom would install multiple phone sockets in premises as requested, but charged a rental fee per socket, to cover installation and maintenance. In this era the ringing tone was generated by electro-mechanical bells in each phone and with pulse dialling then in use, the 6xx series plugs and sockets supported separation of the bell circuit. This was to avoid a bell tinkling noise during dialling, from any on-hook phones in the circuit. The standard multi-extension wiring in residential premises thus used 3 wires of the 4 wire cable. White was wired to pins 2 and 3 which were bridged by a link in each socket. Red (bell circuit) was connect to pin 5 and blue was connected to pin 6. The black wire was unused and left unconnected in the socket. Electro-mechanical phones such as the 800 series had their internal wiring slightly adjusted to support such multiple extension use.

When phones moved to electronic ringers and tone dialling, the additional socket wiring using pins 3 and 5 was no longer needed for suppression and the use of only pair one, with white on pin 2 and blue on pin 6 became the standard socket wiring, until being superseded by the modular connector.

== Modular adaptors ==
All connection schemes connect pair one to the centre two connectors on the modular connector.

=== 6P2C ===
This is the most common scheme, connecting only pair one:

- 6P2C contact 3 to 600 contact 2
- 6P2C contact 4 to 600 contact 6

The pin carrying contacts 3 and 4 is generally completely absent from these adaptors, as are the contacts 1 and 5. Equipment such as handsets, modems and extension bells sold in or for use in Australia often arrives packaged with one of these adaptors.

=== 6P4C ===
This is common in extension cables, many of which have built-in adaptors to 6P4C (and more rarely to 6P6C). There are several conflicting schemes, some using pair two in addition to one, others one and three. As most applications use only pair one, most users are unaware of the potential problem.

Even if no modular connector is included in an extension cable, most 600 series extension cables are four conductor. Pair one is always connected, and either pair two or three.

=== 6P6C ===
A common connection scheme is:

- 6P6C contact 1 to 600 contact 5 (pair 2)
- 6P6C contact 2 to 600 contact 3 (pair 3)
- 6P6C contact 3 to 600 contact 2 (pair 1)
- 6P6C contact 4 to 600 contact 6 (pair 1)
- 6P6C contact 5 to 600 contact 4 (pair 3)
- 6P6C contact 6 to 600 contact 1 (pair 2)
