= Mode 3 (telephone) =

Telephone line sharing method

In telephony, mode 3 is a method of line sharing in which the line passes through a device (the mode 3 device) to connect to other devices. This enables the mode 3 device to control the line, and gain priority in need.

It is a common alternative to parallel connection.

For example, a dial-up computer modem is generally provided with two line connectors, often labelled line and phone. The outside line is connected to the line connector, and handsets may be connected to the phone connector. When the modem is not in use, the line is connected to the handsets, but when the modem is in use, the phone connector is disconnected from the outside line. This prevents accidental interruption of the data service by raising the handset, which could occur if the two devices were simply connected in parallel.

Other devices often wired in mode 3 include:

- Fax machines.
- Autodiallers including:
  - Back to base intrusion alarms.
  - Medical alarms and similar services.

In Australia, mode 3 operation was facilitated by use of the 611 socket.
