= Series 201-299 =

Series 201 to Series 299 may refer to:

== Series 201-210 ==
- Peugeot 20* compact automobile series:
  - Peugeot 201 series (1929-1937)
  - Peugeot 202 series (1938-1949)
  - Peugeot 203 series (1948-1960)
  - Peugeot 204 series (1965-1976)
  - Peugeot 205 series (1983-1998)
  - Peugeot 206 series (1998-2008)
  - Peugeot 207 series (2006-2014)
  - Peugeot 208 series (2012-current)
- EA201 series, Indonesian train series
- 201 series, Japanese train series
- KiHa 201 series, Japanese train series
- EA202 series, Indonesian train series
- 203 series, Indonesian train series
- 205 series, Indonesian train series
- Junkers Jumo 205, aircraft engine series
- HB-E210 series, Japanese train series
- Datsun 210, Nissan automobile series

== Series 211-220 ==
- 211 series, Japanese train series
- 215 series, Japanese train series
- DAF F218 series, the truck series

== Series 231-240 ==
- E231 series, Japanese train series
- E233 series, Japanese train series
- E235 series, Japanese train series
- Volvo 240 series, the automobile series:

== Series 241-250 ==
- DAF F241 series, the truck series
- Ferrari 250, the spotrcar series

== Series 251-260 ==
- 251 series, Japanese train series
- Volvo 260 series, the automobile series:

== Series 261-270 ==
- E261 series, Japanese train series

== Series 271-280 ==
- 271 series, Japanese train series

== Series 281-290 ==
- 281 series, Japanese train series
- KiHa 283 series, Japanese train series
- KiHa 285 series, Japanese train series

== Series 291-299 ==
Preceded by 200 series (disambiguation)	Series 201-299	Succeeded by 300 series (disambiguation)
