= 300s =

300s may refer to:

== Time ==
- The period from 300 to 399, almost synonymous with the 4th century (301–400)
- The period from 300 to 309, known as the 300s decade, almost synonymous with the 31st decade (301-310)
- 300s BCE (century), the period from 399 BCE to 300 BCE, almost synonymous with the 4th century BCE
- 300s BC (decade), the period from 309 BC to 300 BC

== Other uses ==
- Maserati 300S, a racecar
- Extra 300S, a variant of the Extra EA-300 aerobatics airplane

== See also ==
- 300 series (disambiguation)
- S300 (disambiguation)
- 300 (disambiguation)
