= 300th Regiment =

300th Regiment may refer to:

- 300th Armored Cavalry Regiment, United States
- 300th Field Artillery Regiment, United States
- 300th Mechanized Regiment, Ukraine
- 300th Light Anti-Aircraft Regiment, Royal Artillery
- 300th (Tower Hamlets) Light Anti-Aircraft Regiment, Royal Artillery
- 300th (Worcestershire Yeomanry) Anti-Tank Regiment, Royal Artillery

== See also ==
- 300th (disambiguation)
