= S300 =

S300 may refer to:

== Military and aviation ==
- S-300 missile system, a Soviet/Russian surface-to-air missile system
- HNoMS Ula (S300), a Royal Norwegian Navy submarine
- Schweizer 300, formerly Sikorsky S300, a family of light utility helicopters

== Other uses ==
- Canon PowerShot S300, a camera
- Lotus Esprit S300, a car
- Mercedes-Benz S-300, a car
- S300, a Sendo mobile phone model
- S300, a Victorian Railways S class steam locomotive of Australia

== See also ==
- 300 (disambiguation)
- 300s (disambiguation)
- 300 series (disambiguation), including Series 300
