= 200th Regiment =

200th Regiment may refer to:

- 200th Infantry Regiment (United States)
- 200th Pennsylvania Infantry Regiment, a Union Army regiment during the American Civil War

== See also ==
- 200th (disambiguation)
