= 200th Division =

200th Division may refer to:

- 200th Division (National Revolutionary Army), China
- 200th Infantry Division (German Empire)
- 200th Rifle Division, Soviet Union

== See also ==
- List of military divisions by number
- 200th Regiment (disambiguation)
- 200th (disambiguation)
