= 300th Brigade =

300th Brigade may refer to:

== United Kingdom ==
- 300th Brigade, Royal Field Artillery

== United States ==
- 300th Military Intelligence Brigade
- 300th Military Police Brigade
- 300th Sustainment Brigade

== See also ==
- 300th Regiment (disambiguation)
- 300th (disambiguation)
