= 200 series =

200 series may refer to:

== Train types ==
=== Japan ===
- 200 Series Shinkansen
- Meitetsu 200 series EMU, a variant of the Meitetsu 100 series
- Tobu 200 series EMU
- KiHa E200 DMU
- Kominato Railway KiHa 200 series DMU

=== Other ===
- Buenos Aires Underground 200 Series

== Computers ==
- ThinkPad 200 series, a line of laptop computers
- Radeon Rx 200 series
- GeForce 200 series graphics processing units produced by Nvidia

== See also ==
- Series 2 (disambiguation)
- 200
- 2000 series (disambiguation)

Preceded by Series 101-199 (disambiguation)	200 series	Succeeded by Series 201-299 (disambiguation)
Preceded by 100 series (disambiguation)	200 series	Succeeded by 300 series (disambiguation)
