= 300 (disambiguation) =

300 AD was a year.

300 may also refer to:

- 300 BC
- 300 (number)

== Cartridges ==
- .300 AAC Blackout
- .300 Winchester Magnum
- .300 Whisper
- .300 Savage
- .300 Remington Ultra Magnum
- .300 Winchester Short Magnum
- .300 Weatherby Magnum
- .300 H&H Magnum
- .300 Sherwood
- .300 Ruger Compact Magnum
- .300 Remington Short Action Ultra Magnum

== Electronics ==
- Ideacentre Stick 300, a pocket-sized PC in the Lenovo Ideacentre line
- IdeaPad 300, a notebook computer in the Lenovo IdeaPad line
- IdeaPad Miix 300, a tablet computer in the Lenovo Miix line

== Entertainment ==
- 300 (comics), a comics mini-series by Frank Miller, based on the Battle of Thermopylae
  - 300 (film), a 2006 epic war film based on the comic
    - 300 (soundtrack), the soundtrack of the film
    - 300: Rise of an Empire, a 2014 film sequel to the 2006 film
    - 300: Rise of an Empire (soundtrack), the soundtrack of the film
  - 300: March to Glory, a video game based on the comic
- "300" (1975), a pinball game with a bowling theme
- 300 Entertainment, a record label
- Canal 300, a defunct Catalan public television channel
- "300", an episode of American Dad!

== People ==
- 300 Spartans or The Three Hundred, the Spartans who fought to the death at the Battle of Thermopylae
- Old 300, a group of settlers in the Republic of Texas
- 300 soldiers of Gideon, an ancient Judge of Israel
- 300 dissidents of La Guaira naval attack attempting to take over 25,000 Venezuelan military personnel
- Battle of the 300 Champions, a battle fought in roughly 546 BC between Argos and Sparta. Rather than commit full armies both sides agreed to pitting 300 of their best men against each other.

== Sports ==
=== Motor racing ===
- Alsco 300 (Kentucky), a NASCAR series
- California 300, a NASCAR stock car race
- CampingWorld.com 300, a former NASCAR race
- Chicagoland 300, a NASCAR stock car race
- Ford EcoBoost 300, a NASCAR race
- Indy 300, a former open-wheel motor race event
- Hisense 4K TV 300, a NASCAR race event
- Nashville 300, a former NASCAR Nationwide series
- Northern 300, a NASCAR stock car race event
- PowerShares QQQ 300, a first race from NASCAR
- VisitMyrtleBeach.com 300, a former NASCAE race in Sparta, Kentucky

=== Other sports ===
- 300 win club, a group of pitchers
- A perfect game of ten-pin bowling is a score of 300

== Transportation ==
=== Roads ===
- Delaware Route 300, a state highway
- Maryland Route 300, a state highway
- Tennessee State Route 300, a four-lane controlled-access expressway

=== Vehicles ===
- Airbus A300, a commercial jet airliner
- Chrysler 300, a full-sized luxury car made and sold by Chrysler
- Dragoon 300, an amphibious armored vehicle
- Jagdgeschwader 300, a Luftwaffe fighter-wing of World War II
- Kawasaki Ninja 300, a sport bike
- Latécoère 300, a group of civil and military flying boat
- Lexus ES 300, a mid-size luxury sedan sold by Lexus
- Lexus IS 300, a compact executive car sold by Lexus
- Lexus RX 300, a luxury crossover sold by Lexus
- Nissan 300C, a luxury car
- Nissan 300ZX, a sports car
- Schweizer 300, a helicopter
- 300 Series Shinkansen, a Japanese high-speed Shinkansen train type
- Tank 300, an SUV
- Dodge 300, a medium to heavy duty truck
- Lloyd 300, a supermini car

== Other ==
- Committee of 300, aka The Olympians, a conspiracy theory
- 300 Geraldina, an asteroid
- NGC 300, a galaxy
- Cargo 300, military jargon for the transport of wounded. In this context 300 is slang for wounded.

== See also ==
- 300th (disambiguation)
- CCC (disambiguation), Roman numeral representation of 300
- 300 series (disambiguation)
