= 200 =

200 may also refer to:

- AD 200
- 200 BC
- 200 (number)
- 200 (film), a 1975 short film by Vince Collins
- 200 Dynamene, a main-belt asteroid
- 200 metres, a running event
- 200 Series Shinkansen, a train model
- "200" (South Park), an episode of South Park
- "200" (Stargate SG-1), an episode of Stargate SG-1
- "200" (Criminal Minds), an episode of Criminal Minds
- Billboard 200, a record chart
- Cargo 200, military code and jargon for combat dead
- Chrysler 200, a mid-size sedan introduced by Chrysler in 2010
- Lexus IS 200, a compact executive car sold by Lexus
- Rover 200 Series, a series of cars made by the Rover Group
- Audi 200, a mid-sized executive car sold by Audi
- 200, a song from Becoming a Pop Star by Yanga Chief
- 200, a song from Plastic Death by Glass Beach
- 200, a song by Mark Lee

== See also ==
- 200th (disambiguation)
- 200 series (disambiguation)
