= 300th =

300th may refer to:

- 1st Battalion, 300th Armored Cavalry Regiment, tank destroyer battalion of the United States Army active during World War II
- 300th (Tower Hamlets) Light Anti-Aircraft Regiment, Royal Artillery, unit of Britain's Territorial Force formed in 1908 from Volunteer corps dating back to 1859
- 300th (Worcestershire Yeomanry) Anti-Tank Regiment, Royal Artillery or Queen's Own Worcestershire Hussars, Yeomanry regiment of the British Army
- 300th Airlift Squadron, part of the 315th Airlift Wing at Charleston Air Force Base, South Carolina
- 300th anniversary of the Romanov dynasty, country-wide celebration, marked in the Russian Empire from February 1913, in celebration of the ruling Romanov Dynasty
- 300th Armored Cavalry Regiment, Texas-based reconnaissance unit of the United States Army Organized Reserve Corps, which briefly existed after World War II
- 300th Bomber Command, Polish World War II bomber unit
- 300th Field Artillery Regiment, Field Artillery regiment of the United States Army
- 300th Mechanized Regiment (Ukraine), formation of the Ukrainian Ground Forces
- 300th Military Intelligence Brigade (United States), United States Army formation, subordinate to the United States Army Intelligence and Security Command (INSCOM)
- 300th Sustainment Brigade (United States), Major Subordinate Command (MSC) of the 4th Expeditionary Sustainment Command (ESC)
- Gothenburg 300th anniversary, a world's fair held in Gothenburg, Sweden during 1923 marking 300th anniversary of the founding of the city

== See also ==
- 300 (number)
- 300 (disambiguation)
- 300, the year 300 (CCC) of the Julian calendar
- 300 BC
