= Model 3 (disambiguation) =

Model 3 or Tesla Model 3, is an electric vehicle.

Model 3 may also refer to:

== Transportation ==
- MVP Model 3, an aircraft
- Pescara Model 3 Helicopter

== Other uses ==
- Sega Model 3, arcade system board
- Smith & Wesson Model 3, a revolver
- TRS-80 Model III, a computer

== See also ==
- Series 3 (disambiguation)
