= Series 3 =

Series 3 may refer to:

- 3 Skypephone Series, the mobile phone series
- Apple Watch Series 3, smart watch
- Aston Martin Lagonda Series 3, the automobile model
- Aston Martin V8 Series 3, the automobile model
- BMW 3 Series, the automobile model line
- GeForce 3 series, line of nVidia video cards
- GP3 Series, motor racing series
- Land Rover series#Series_III, motor vehicle
- Psion Series 3, handheld computer line
- Samsung Series 3 Chromebox, a line of minicomputers
- Scania 3-series, the truck model line
- South African Class 6E1, Series 3, electric locomotive series
- Super3 Series, motor racing series

== See also ==
- 300 series (disambiguation)
- System 3 (disambiguation)
- Model 3 (disambiguation)
