= 200th =

200th may refer to:

- 200th (2/1st Surrey) Brigade, formation of the British Army during the First World War
- 200th (Winnipeg) Battalion, CEF, unit in the Canadian Expeditionary Force during the First World War
- 200th Airlift Squadron, unit of the Colorado Air National Guard 140th Wing located at Peterson Air Force Base
- 200th Coast Artillery (United States) (200 CA), United States Army unit during the first half of World War II
- 200th Division (National Revolutionary Army), the first mechanised division in the National Revolutionary Army
- 200th Independent Motor Rifle Brigade, military formation of the Russian Ground Forces based at Pechenga in Murmansk Oblast
- 200th Military Police Command (United States), the senior law enforcement unit within the U.S. Army Reserve
- 200th Street (disambiguation), a number of stations of the New York City Subway
- 200th Street (IRT Third Avenue Line), local station on the demolished IRT Third Avenue Line, near the New York Botanical Garden
- 200th Street (Manhattan)
- Bedford Park Boulevard-200th Street (IRT Jerome Avenue Line station), local station on the IRT Jerome Avenue Line of the New York City Subway
- Dyckman Street (200th Street), station on the IND Eighth Avenue Line of the New York City Subway
- Pennsylvania's 200th Representative District
- S. 200th (Link station) will be an elevated Sound Transit Link Light Rail Station in SeaTac, Washington
- Cargo 200, which is often nicknamed as 200th one - in Soviet and post-Soviet military slang stands for a person who was killed in action.
- 200th Regiment (disambiguation)

== See also ==
- 200 (number)
- 200
- AD 200, the year 200 (CC) of the Julian calendar
- 200 BC
