= 2000 series =

2000 series may refer to:

== Japanese train types ==
- Aichi Loop Railway 2000 series electric multiple unit
- Chichibu Railway 2000 series electric multiple unit
- Chikuho Electric Railroad 2000 series electric multiple unit operated on the Chikuhō Electric Railroad Line
- Choshi Electric Railway 2000 series electric multiple unit
- Fujikyu 2000 series electric multiple unit
- Fukuoka Subway 2000 series electric multiple unit
- Hankyu 2000 series (1960) electric multiple unit
- Hankyu 2000 series (2025) electric multiple unit
- JR Shikoku 2000 series diesel multiple unit
- Keikyu 2000 series electric multiple unit
- Keio 2000 series electric multiple unit
- Kobe New Transit 2000 series electric multiple unit
- Kotoden 2000 series electric multiple uni
- Meitetsu 2000 series electric multiple unit
- Nagano Electric Railway 2000 series electric multiple unit
- Nagoya Municipal Subway 2000 series electric multiple unit
- Odakyu 2000 series electric multiple unit
- Osaka Monorail 2000 series electric multiple unit
- Saitama Rapid Railway 2000 series electric multiple unit
- Sendai Subway 2000 series electric multiple unit
- Tokyo Monorail 2000 series electric multiple unit
- Tokyo Metro 2000 series electric multiple unit
- Tokyu 2000 series electric multiple unit
- Tōyō Rapid 2000 series electric multiple unit
- TX-2000 series electric multiple unit

== Other ==
- 2000 series (Chicago 'L')
- 2000 class railcar (Adelaide Metro)
- Radeon HD 2000 series graphics processing units developed by ATI
- SPV-2000 (Budd Company)
