= Divergent (soundtrack) =

2014 compilation soundtrack album

Divergent: Original Motion Picture Soundtrack

Soundtrack album by Various artists
- Released: March 11, 2014
- Recorded: Various times
- Genres: Alternative rock; indie pop; electronic; hip hop
- Length: 48:25
- Label: Interscope

Singles from Divergent: Original Motion Picture Soundtrack
- 1. "Find You" Released: January 26, 2014; 2. "Beating Heart" Released: April 22, 2014

Professional ratings
Review scores
Source	Rating
AllMusic	3.5/5 stars
Rolling Stone	2/5 stars

Divergent: Original Motion Picture Soundtrack is the soundtrack album to the 2014 film Divergent, based on the book series of the same name. The soundtrack for the film was chosen by music supervisor Randall Poster. The Divergent: Original Motion Picture Soundtrack album released on March 11, 2014, while the Original Score of the film released on March 18, 2014, by Interscope Records. The soundtrack album sold 10,000 copies in its first week of release.

The first single from the soundtrack album, "Find You" by Zedd featuring Matthew Koma and Miriam Bryant, was released on January 26, 2014. "Beating Heart" by Ellie Goulding was released on April 22, 2014, as the second single from the soundtrack.

== Divergent: Original Motion Picture Soundtrack ==
=== Background ===
Ellie Goulding's song "Dead in the Water" from her 2012 album Halcyon was featured in the film's first official clip, released on December 19, 2013. The song was later included on the soundtrack album. Goulding has four songs on the soundtrack album (three tracks on the 'standard' soundtrack album, and one as bonus song on the deluxe edition) and she also provided vocals for the score of the film (on four tracks). According to director Neil Burger, "We started working with songs from Ellie Goulding's album Halcyon and soon found that the texture of her music and the tone of her voice perfectly matched our film. In many ways Ellie has become the inner voice of our heroine Tris."

Inspiration for the soundtrack came from Kanye West's 2013 album Yeezus. According to music supervisor Randall Poster, "One of the great creative breakthroughs we had was that we, talking to Neil Burger the director, really looked at Kanye's Yeezus record and 'Black Skinhead' in particular and said, 'You know what, musically this sounds like the world of Dauntless, obviously, the lyrical topicality was not going to work for us and so doing some exploration we sort of landed on this [French DJ] producer Gesaffelstein who worked with Kanye [West]." Randall further talked about the soundtrack album, "I think that one of the challenges for a movie like this is that it's set in the future and so you sort of have to figure out, 'OK, what might music in the future sound like?' The film is actually set not in a perfected future, but actually kind of in a future world that is deteriorating. And so we wanted to create a musical element that had reflected on current music sounds, but also felt kind of time-forward and had a certain futuristic element. Really our notion was to find music that was dangerous, tribal and had electronic elements without really being dance-y."

The album also contained music from British alternative rock band Snow Patrol, Kendrick Lamar, Tame Impala, M83, ASAP Rocky and Pia Mia.

=== Marketing ===
The soundtrack album was available on Pitchfork Advance, a music streaming platform that host full-length pre-release albums in advance, from March 7 to 10, 2014.

=== Track listing ===
No.	Title	Writer(s)	Artist(s)	Length
1.	"Find You"	Zedd; Matthew Koma; Miriam Bryant; Victor Rådström	Zedd featuring Matthew Koma and Miriam Bryant	3:23
2.	"Beating Heart"	Ellie Goulding; Joe Janiak	Ellie Goulding	3:31
3.	"Fight for You"	Michael Volpe; Marc Griffin; Pia Mia; Chancelor Bennett; Nicholas Balding; Andrew VanWyngarden; Ben Goldwasser	Pia Mia featuring Chance The Rapper	4:35
4.	"Hanging On" (I See Monstas remix)	Patrick James Grossi; Ariel Rechtshaid	Ellie Goulding	4:04
5.	"I Won't Let You Go"	Gary Lightbody; Jacknife Lee	Snow Patrol	4:07
6.	"Run Boy Run"	Woodkid; Ambroise Willaume	Woodkid	3:32
7.	"Backwards"	Kevin Parker; Kendrick Duckworth	Tame Impala and Kendrick Lamar	3:54
8.	"I Need You"	Anthony Gonzalez	M83	3:01
9.	"In Distress"	Rakim Mayers; Mike Levy	ASAP Rocky featuring Gesaffelstein	3:09
10.	"Lost and Found" (Odesza Remix)	Derek Vincent Smith	Pretty Lights	4:36
11.	"Stranger"	Sonny Moore; Justin Parker; Sam Dew; Graham Muron	Skrillex with KillaGraham from Milo and Otis featuring Sam Dew	4:50
12.	"Dream Machines"	KC Underwood; Alice Costelloe	Big Deal	2:59
13.	"Dead in the Water"	Goulding; Fin Dow-Smith	Ellie Goulding	4:44
Total length:				48:25

Deluxe edition bonus tracks
No.	Title	Artist(s)	Length
14.	"I Love You"	Woodkid	3:49
15.	"Waiting Game"	Banks	3:26
16.	"My Blood"	Ellie Goulding	3:54

=== Charts ===
Chart (2014)	Peak position
Australian Albums (ARIA)	18
Belgian Albums (Ultratop Flanders)	75
Belgian Albums (Ultratop Wallonia)	87
French Albums (SNEP)	153
Norwegian Albums (VG-lista)	24
New Zealand Albums (RMNZ)	38
South Korean International Albums (Gaon)	36
UK Compilation Albums (OCC)	45
UK Dance Albums (Official Charts)	14
US Billboard 200	16
US Top Soundtracks (Billboard)	2

== Divergent: Original Motion Picture Score ==
Divergent: Original Motion Picture Score

Film score by Junkie XL
- Released: March 18, 2014
- Genre: Orchestral
- Length: 89:31
- Label: Interscope
- Producer: Junkie XL

Junkie XL chronology
300: Rise of an Empire (2014)	Divergent (2014)	The Amazing Spider-Man 2 (2014)

The score of the film was composed by Junkie XL, with Hans Zimmer executive producing the album. They both previously collaborated on Man of Steel, The Dark Knight Rises, Shark Tale, Megamind and the Madagascar series. Ellie Goulding is featured as a vocalist on the score. The album was released digitally in United States on March 18, 2014, by Interscope Records, and was later released in both physical and digital formats internationally on March 31, 2014.

=== Track listing ===
1. "Tris" (featuring Ellie Goulding) – 7:48
2. "The Test" – 3:17
3. "Choosing Dauntless" (featuring Ellie Goulding) – 3:44
4. "Capture the Flag" (featuring Ellie Goulding) – 3:06
5. "This Isn't Real" – 1:38
6. "Ferris Wheel" – 3:31
7. "Erudite Plan" – 3:20
8. "Fear" – 3:36
9. "I Am Divergent" – 1:38
10. "A Friend" – 2:47
11. "Conspiracy" – 5:26
12. "Watertank" – 1:50
13. "Faction Before Blood" – 6:48
14. "Human Nature" – 3:12
15. "Final Test" – 1:37
16. "The March" – 5:17
17. "Dauntless Attack" – 5:55
18. "Sacrifice" (featuring Ellie Goulding) – 4:20
19. "You're Not Gonna Like This" (digital bonus track) – 14:00
20. "Fight the Dauntless" – 4:13
21. "Everywhere and Nowhere" – 2:28
