= 300: Rise of an Empire (soundtrack) =

300: Rise of an Empire (Original Motion Picture Soundtrack)

Film score by Junkie XL
- Released: March 4, 2014
- Genre: Film score
- Length: 67:51
- Label: WaterTower Music
- Producer: Junkie XL

Junkie XL chronology
Paranoia (2013)	300: Rise of an Empire (2014)	Divergent (2014)

300: Rise of an Empire (Original Motion Picture Soundtrack) is the score album to the 2014 film of the same name directed by Noam Murro, a follow-up to the 2006 film 300. Zack Snyder, who directed the first film, served as the screenwriter and producer for the sequel. The score is composed by Tom Holkenborg, known under the stage name Junkie XL, as credited in the album. The film marked the beginning of a collaboration between Snyder and Holkenborg where the latter would work on Snyder's future directorial ventures, beginning with Batman v Superman: Dawn of Justice (2016). The album featuring 16-cues of Junkie XL's score running for one-hour and seven minutes, released through WaterTower Music on March 4, 2014, in digital and physical formats.

== Development ==
"300 is not your bread and butter history film. It takes place in a certain time period, but for me, a movie like that is more about something else. It's the art of the visuals and how to tell a story through the art of the visuals. If you look at it from that point of view, you can take some liberty with the music, I feel. It's different from I would almost say Gladiator, which feels more like an historic drama."

— Junkie XL, on the context that served for writing the film's music

Junkie XL was offered to score the film when he assisted Hans Zimmer on Man of Steel (2013), thereby getting in touch with Snyder. He intended for a "strongly rhythm orientated" score using original instruments from that time period and culture, and felt that "this is not like your typical traditional, historical drama, but this is like a comic book in live action version". Hence, the music needed to be modern as well as traditional at the same time.

When he saw the film first, he felt that most of the incidents taking place at the sea and the sound effects of the waves had a rhythm to them. Hence, he decided to make rhythm for the waves, so that it would underscore multiple themes for the score. For the traditional instruments, he explored a variety of scales that very popular in ancient and modern Persian culture, because the music culture goes back to many years. Two scales — Homayoun and Chahargah — were picked for the film as it would work with in Western music. He wanted to explore further on the harmony and melodies from the Persian side of Greece, especially for the themes of Artemisia and Xerxes, and for that, he used guitar and sitar, as well as traditional percussion instruments from Persia were used even though they were beefed up with the electronic music he created.

For the Greeks, he used to create music from the ancient Western instrument Aulos, a type of traditional flute that were obsolete currently. He created a similar instrument to that by making sounds from a flautist, who made one on the spot from straws and with the right mouth piece, which was "supposedly pretty close to what that instrument should have been". He wanted to make sure that he had an overall sound over the film which was not necessarily from any of those cultures, but a "cool" sound. Hence, he used a piano to build that music, and further said "I took a really old piano and I got an axe and I hit everything away except for the inside train, and I built a holding case around it, and I started using bass and guitar pickups. It basically became an instrument that holds the middle between an electric guitar and a piano, and I would only play it with sticks. That instrument has become very important throughout the whole score, which is not a traditional instrument of any of those cultures, but I just thought it was a really cool element to have."

== Track listing ==
No.	Title	Length
1.	"History of Artemisia"	9:34
2.	"Marathon"	3:54
3.	"From Man To God King"	3:50
4.	"Sparta"	1:05
5.	"Artemisia's Childhood"	3:42
6.	"Suicide"	1:18
7.	"Left For Dead"	1:32
8.	"Fog Battle"	4:35
9.	"A Beach Of Bodies"	4:17
10.	"Fire Battle"	6:11
11.	"Xerxes' Thoughts"	3:44
12.	"Queen Gorgo"	3:59
13.	"Greeks On Attack"	4:28
14.	"History Of The Greeks"	7:04
15.	"Greeks Are Winning"	6:04
16.	"End Credits"	2:34
Total length:		67:51

== Reception ==
Movie Music Mania gave a negative review saying "300: Rise of an Empire is at best an unremarkable score. At worst (as most critics will attest), this is bottom of the barrel action noise. And this is coming from someone who enjoyed the origin of this score's framework, Zimmer's controversial Man of Steel. The obvious rebuttal is that, well, this is Sparta (or at least Athens) so what more should one expect from this kind of score? Much of this score fails to even actively engage the listener, instead thwacking us over the head with a wall of dissonant thrashing. Aside from suffering from a chronic emulation of Man of Steel down to the score's motifs, sound design, and perhaps even orchestral samplings (as it often sounds like Junkie XL is drawing from the same library of sounds assembled for Zimmer's production), 300: Rise of an Empire also fails to be much fun at all. What redeems some of this is that Junkie XL does form a few recurring motifs and themes, unremarkable as they are, out of an otherwise passable effort." Mac McNaughton of The Music felt that the music for Rise of the Empire is "the sound of a capable artist peaking not very highly. Lots of swelling strings and creepy atmospherics convey the darkness and bloody helplessness of the source material in box-ticking form, but much of this could have been pilfered from Spartacus' TV soundtrack. Nothing here makes you truly feel the unstoppable thunder of the mighty Greeks."

Scott Foundas of Variety called it as "throbbing, musical score seems to be echoing forth from some distant place in the cosmos." Todd McCarthy of The Hollywood Reporter wrote "The score by Junkie XL is predictably orotund, although some unusual and arresting moments emerge here and there." Rodrigo Perez of The Playlist wrote "scored by Junkie XL, the film is mercifully free of the propulsive, big-beat electronica the Dutch composer is known, but the score is as anonymous as it would have been if written by any number of the faceless Hans Zimmer disciples who usually crank out such work." Tyler Schirado, writing for Turn The Right Corner, said "Composer Junkie XL does a decent job at matching the heavy metal sounds of Tyler Bates' original score from 300, so much so that it feels familiar in tone yet he is able to make it his own." James Christopher Monger of AllMusic wrote Holkenborg's "highly percussive style complements the film's highly stylized look and over-the-op violence".

== Credits ==
Credits adapted from CD liner notes.

Production

- Composer, producer, arrangements, mixing and sound design – Junkie XL
- Additional programming – Christian Vorländer, Emad Borjian, Stephen Perone
- Pro-tools score recording – Joel Tawinaki
- Mastering – Stephen Marsh, Junkie XL
- Music editor – Melissa Muik
- Assistant music editor – Nevin Seus
- Score co-ordinator – Czarina Russell
- Scoring crew – Jamie Olivera, Richard Wheeler Jr., Ryan Robinson, Tom Hardisty
- Music preparation – Booker White, Michiel Groeneveld, Steven Kofsky
- Art direction – Sandeep Sriram

Instruments

- Bass – Bruce Morgenthaler, Drew Dembowski, Edward Meares, Michael Valerio, Nico Abondolo, Stephen Dress
- Cello – Andrew Shulman, Armen Ksajikian, Cecilia Tsan, George Kim Scholes, Paula Hochhalter, Steve Erdody, Trevor Handy, Xiaodan Zheng
- Drums, frame drum, guitar, bass, synthesizer, dulcimer, piano – Junkie XL
- Horn – Amy Rhine, Anna Bosler, Benjamin Jaber, Daniel Kelley, Dylan Hart, Justin Hageman
- Sitar – Emad Borjian
- Trombone – Alexander Iles, Andrew Martin, William Reichenbach, Craig Gosnell, Phillip Teele, Phillip Keen, Steven Holtman, William Booth
- Tuba – Blake Cooper, Doug Tornquist, John Van Houten Jr., Lukas Storm
- Viola – Alma Fernandez, Andrew Duckles, Brian Dembow, Darrin Mc Cann, Jennie Hansen, Matthew Funes, Robert Brophy, Shawn Mann, Thomas Diener, Victoria Miskolczy
- Violin – Ana Landauer, Charlie Bisharat, Cheryl Norman-Brick, Darius Campo, Dimitrie Leivici, Eun-Mee Ahn, Grace E. Oh, Irina Voloshina, Jay Rosen, Joel Pargman, Josefina Vergara, Julie Gigante, Mary Sloan, Katia Popov, Kevin Connolly, Lisa Liu, Lisa Sutton, Marc Sazer, Natalie Leggett, Neil Samples, Nina Evtuhov, Phillip Levy, Rafael Rishik, Rebecca Bunnell, Roberto Cani, Sara Parkins, Sarah Thornblade, Serena Mc Kinney, Yelena Yegorian
- Vocals – Hilda Orvarsdottir, MC Rai
- Woodwind – Pedro Eustache

Orchestra

- Orchestra – The Hollywood Studio Symphony
- Conductor – Nick Glennie-Smith
- Orchestra contractor – Peter Rotter
- Vocal contractor – Japser Randall
- Orchestration – Carl Rydlund, Kevin Kaska, Walter Fowler, Yvonne Suzette Moriarty
- Supervising orchestrator – Bruce L. Fowler
- Concertmaster – Bruce Dukov

Management

- Executive producer – Bernie Goldman, Deborah Snyder, Gianni Nunnari, Mark Canton, Zack Snyder
- Executive in charge of music (Warner Bros. Pictures) – Darren Higman, Paul Broucek
- Executive in charge (WaterTower Music) – Jason Linn
- Music business affairs – Lisa Margolis
- Artist management – Michiel Groeneveld
- Music payroll – Gary Wasserman

== See also ==
- 300 Original Motion Picture Soundtrack
