= 300 series =

300 series may refer to:

== Train types ==
=== Japan ===
- 300 Series Shinkansen
- Chichibu Railway 300 series electric multiple unit
- Choshi Electric Railway 300 series electric multiple unit
- HB-E300 series hybrid diesel multiple unit
- JR Freight Class HD300 hybrid diesel locomotive
- Meitetsu 300 series electric multiple unit
- Tobu 300 series electric multiple unit

=== Other ===
- Buenos Aires Underground 200 Series

== Computer hardware ==
- ThinkPad 300 series, a line of laptop computers

=== Consumer graphics cards ===
- Radeon Rx 300 series
- GeForce 300 series

== Other ==
- Kodak DCS 300 series digital camera
- Rickenbacker 300 Series guitar
- Volvo 300 Series car
- 300 series, or austenitic stainless steel

== See also ==
- Series 3 (disambiguation)
- 300 (disambiguation)
- 3000 series (disambiguation)

Preceded by Series 201-299 (disambiguation)	300 series	Succeeded by Series 301-399 (disambiguation)
Preceded by 200 series (disambiguation)	300 series	Succeeded by 400 series (disambiguation)
