= KiHa 285 series =

Japanese train type

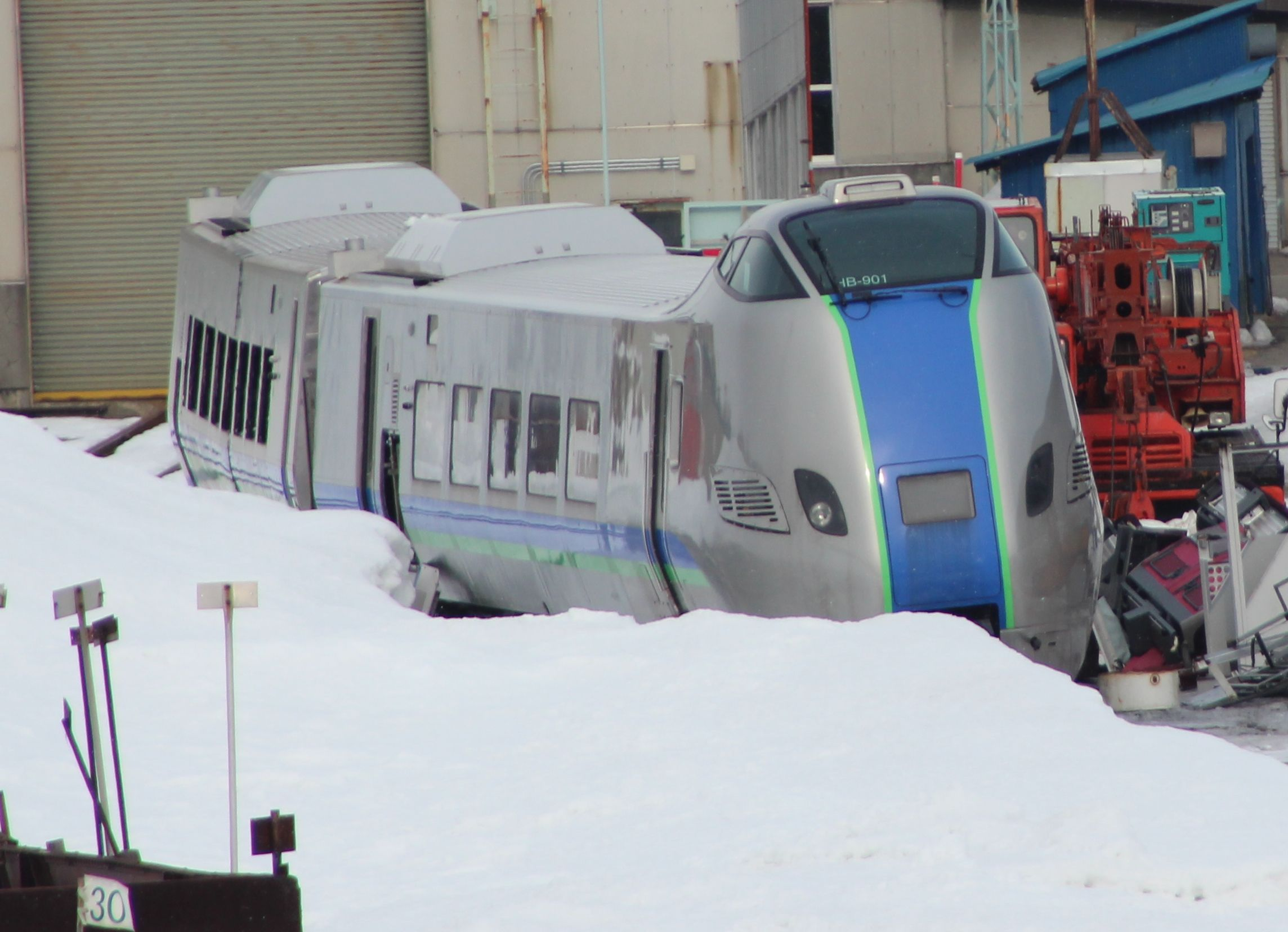
- The KiHa 285 series set being cut up in March 2017
- Manufacturer: Kawasaki Heavy Industries
- Built at: Kobe
- Constructed: 2014
- Scrapped: 2017
- Number built: 3 vehicles
- Formation: 3 cars per trainset
- Fleet numbers: HB-901
- Operator: JR Hokkaido

Specifications
- Car body construction: Stainless steel
- Maximum speed: 140 km/h (87 mph)
- Track gauge: 1,067 mm (3 ft 6 in)

The KiHa 285 series (キハ285系) was a tilting diesel multiple unit (DMU) train type developed by Hokkaido Railway Company (JR Hokkaido), originally intended for use on limited express services in Hokkaido, Japan. One three-car trainset was completed in September 2014 by Kawasaki Heavy Industries in Kobe, but plans to construct any further KiHa 285 series trains were cancelled the same month, and the trainset built was scrapped without entering revenue service.

The "KiHa" designation derives from the classification system used by JNR. "Ki" indicates a diesel-powered vehicle, while "Ha" indicates an ordinary passenger car, as opposed to a green car.

== Design ==
The KiHa 285 series train uses a new compound tilting system, which tilts the train vehicles by up to 8 degrees using a pendular system (tilt of up to 6 degrees) combined with air suspension tilting (tilt of up to 2 degrees). The train also uses a new motor-assisted ("MA") hybrid diesel traction system, which supplements conventional diesel traction with batteries, inverters, and electric motors. The train was designed to allow a maximum speed of 140 km/h (87 mph) even on curves. Total development costs for the train came to 2.5 billion yen.

== Formation ==
The single three-car set built was numbered HB-901, and formed as shown below.

Numbering	KiHa 285-901	KiHa 284-901	KiHa 285-902

== History ==
Design work for the prototype KiHa 285 series train commenced in April 2011. On 10 September 2014, JR Hokkaido announced that it was terminating development and production of further trains following the completion of one three-car set built by Kawasaki Heavy Industries. The decision was made following reassessments of priorities by JR Hokkaido, with a shift away from focusing on increasing operating speeds to reduce journey time, with a greater focus on safety and maintenance costs through standardization of its diesel fleet. Ageing diesel trains were instead replaced by KiHa 261 series trains, first introduced in 2000.

The three-car trainset was delivered from Kawasaki Heavy Industries factory in Kobe to JR Hokkaido's Naebo Works in September 2014. After undergoing low-speed testing within the confines of Naebo Works, the set was first test-run on the Hakodate Main Line on 31 October 2014.

Following the cancellation of further production, JR Hokkaido initially considered the possibility of converting the three-car trainset for use as a track and overhead wire inspection train.

The three cars were officially removed from the JR Hokkaido fleet list on 31 March 2015. In April 2016, JR Hokkaido revealed that the complex design of the train made conversion more expensive than the option of purchasing a new purpose-built inspection train, and work to cut up the train commenced in March 2017.
