= Keio 2000 series =

Japanese electric multiple unit train type

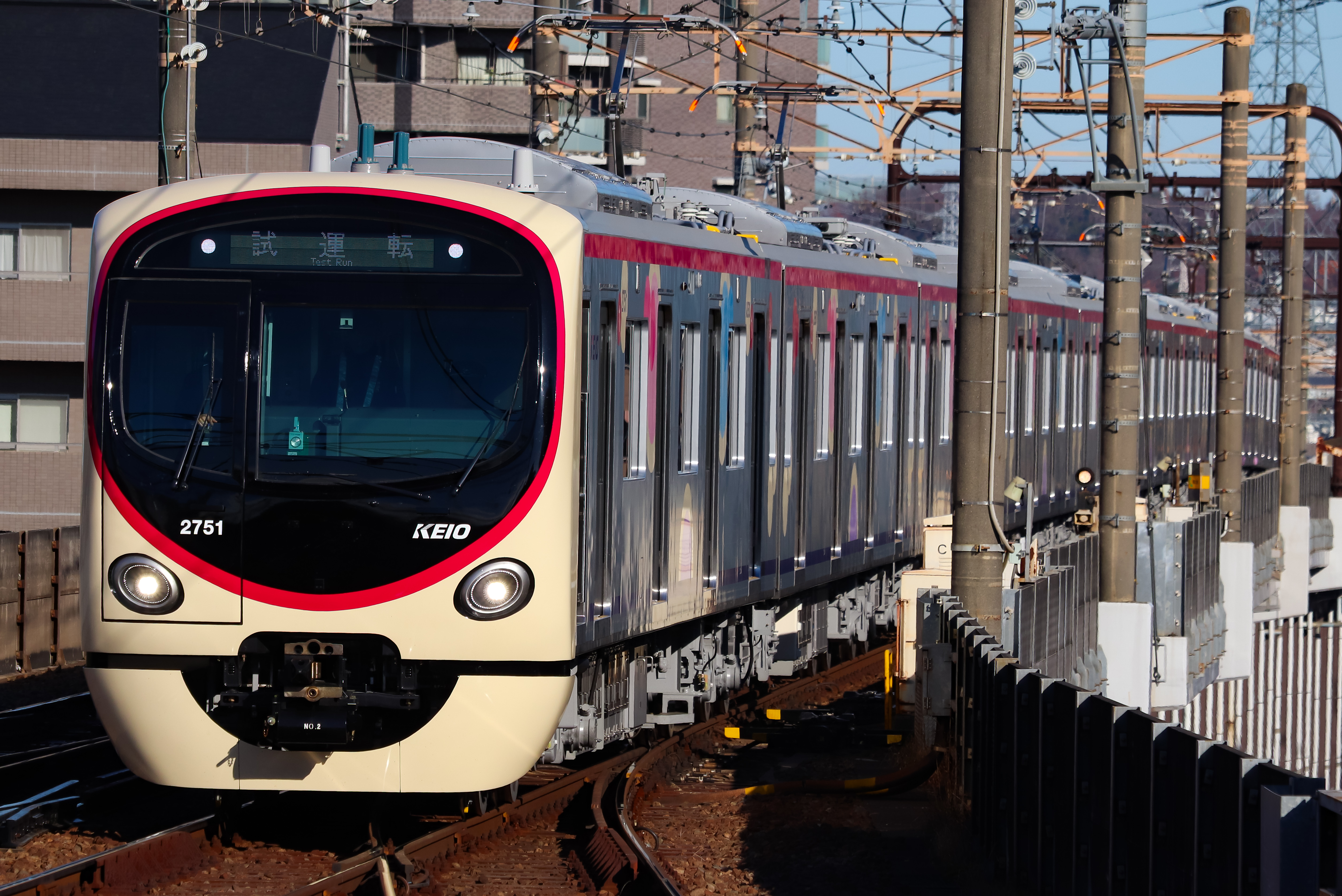
- 2000 series set on test in December 2025
- Manufacturer: J-TREC
- Replaced: Keio 7000 series
- Constructed: 2025–present
- Entered service: 31 January 2026
- Number under construction: 10 vehicles (1 set)
- Number built: 30 vehicles (3 sets)
- Formation: 10 cars per trainset
- Fleet numbers: 2701–
- Operator: Keio Corporation
- Lines served: Keiō Line; Sagamihara Line

Specifications
- Maximum speed: 130 km/h (81 mph) (design)
- Traction system: SiC–VVVF
- Electric systems: 1,500 V DC overhead catenary
- Current collection: Pantograph

The Keio 2000 series (Japanese: 京王2000系) is an electric multiple unit (EMU) train type operated by the private railway operator Keio Corporation in Japan since 2026.

== Design ==
The 2000 series trains adopt a rounded front end as well as a circular motif on the side exterior that give a sense of gentleness, and are intended to be passenger-friendly for various generations.

Internally, a wide open "free space", branded "Hidamari Space" (ひだまりスペース), is included near one end of car 5 to provide improved accessibility to strollers and wheelchairs, a first for Keio. This area also features enlarged windows to keep children occupied throughout train journeys. Every car has one priority/accessible "free space" and is equipped with two "nanoe X" purifiers as well as four internal surveillance cameras with real-time transmission abilities.

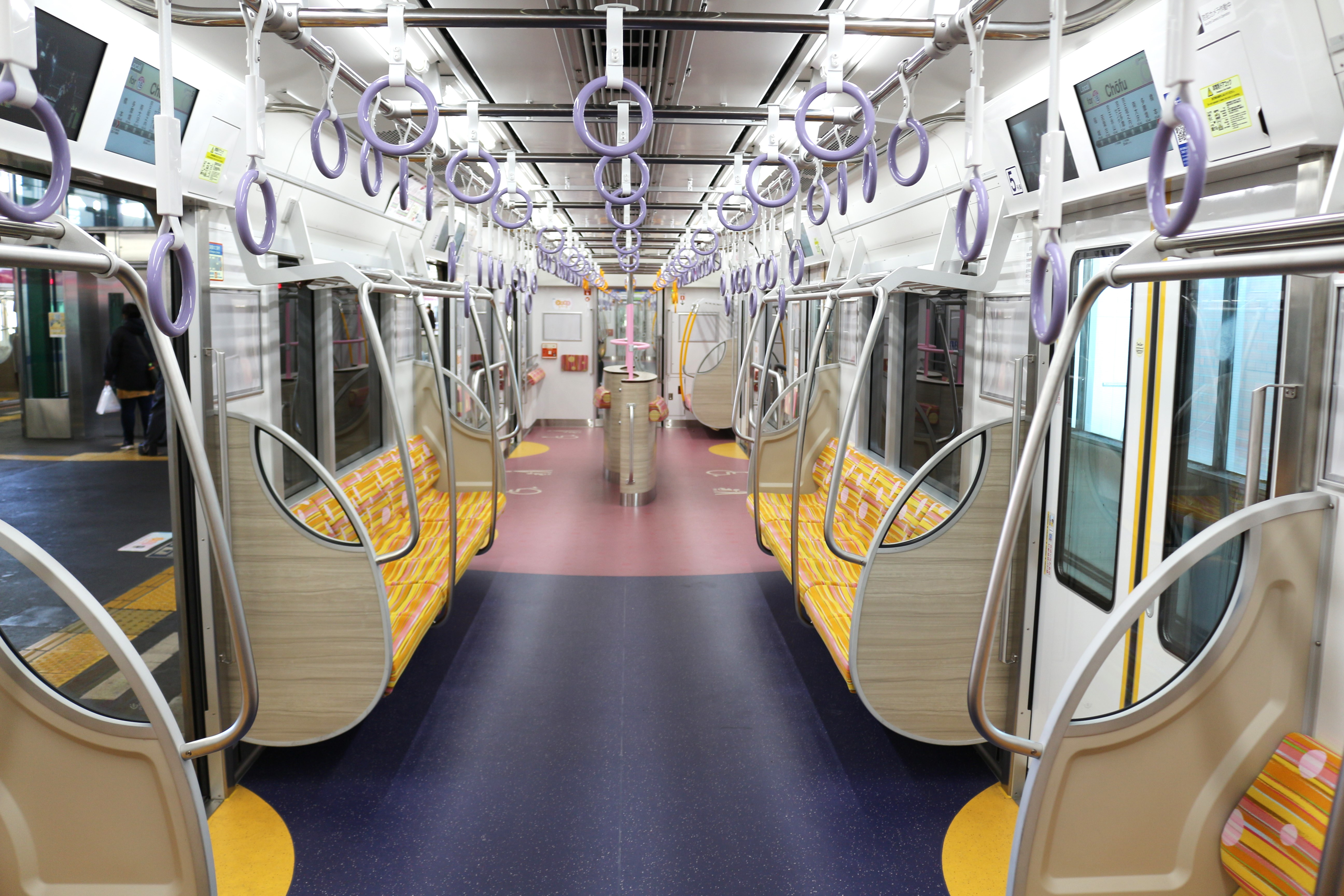
Interior

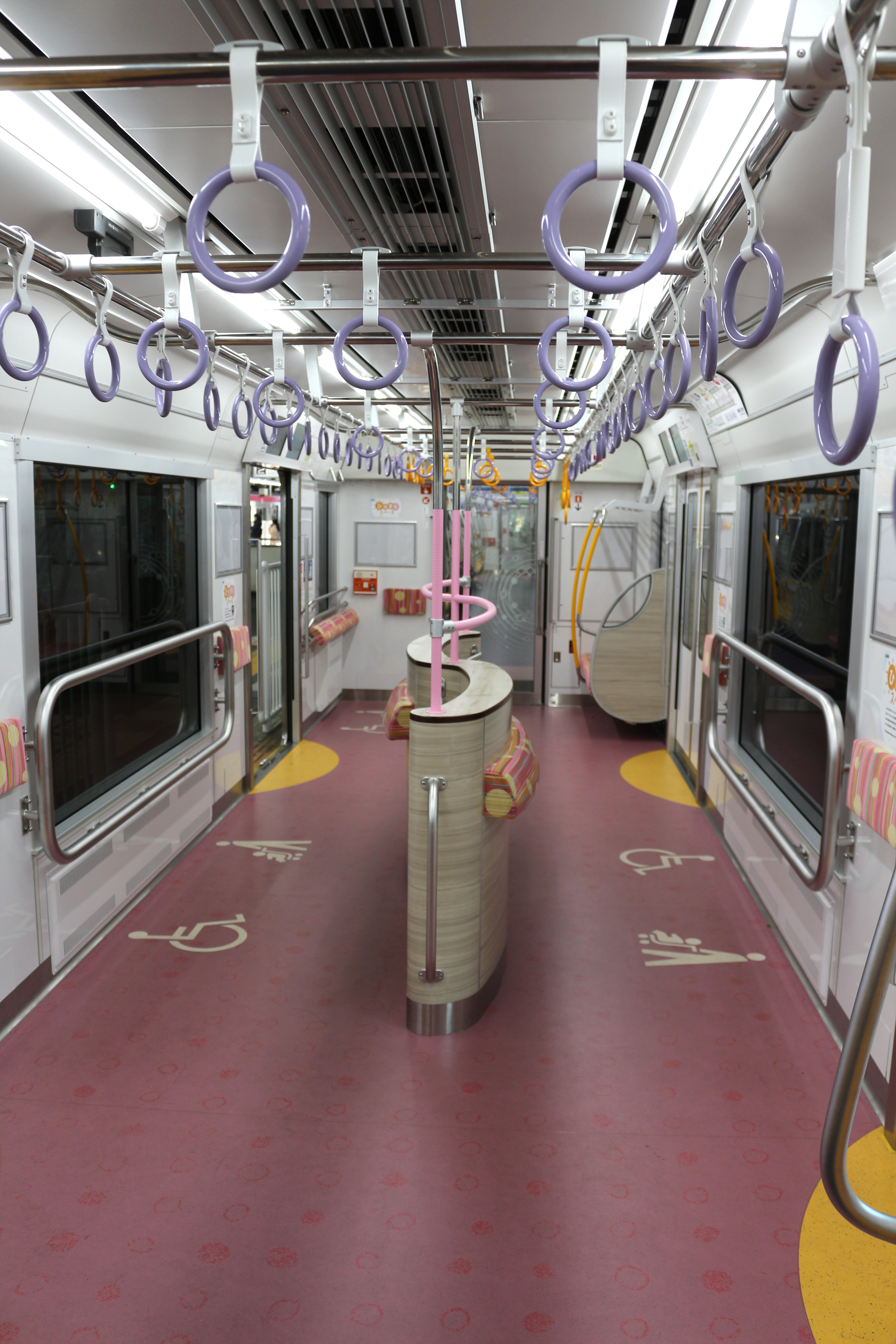
Hidamari Space

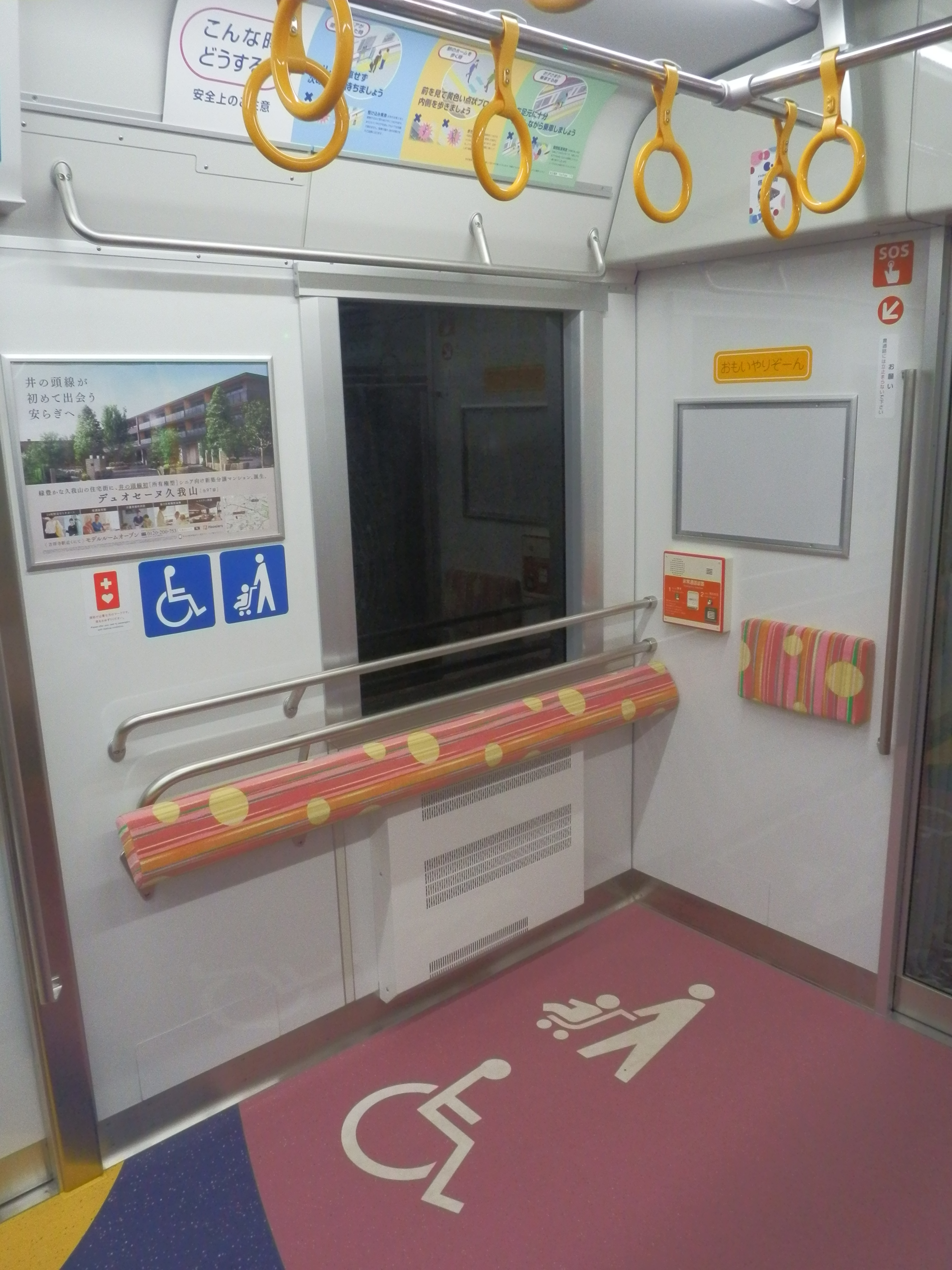
Free space

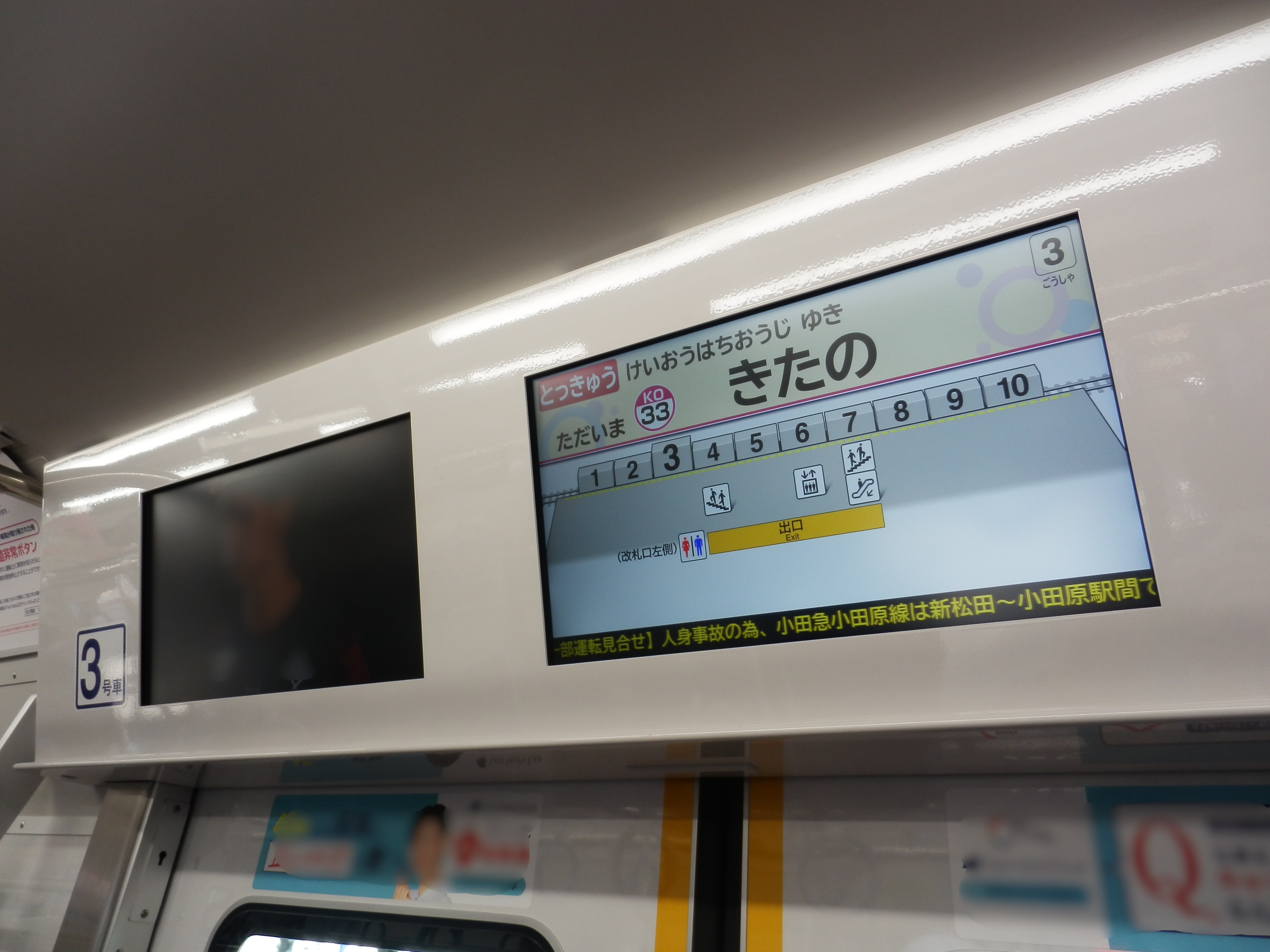
LCD information display

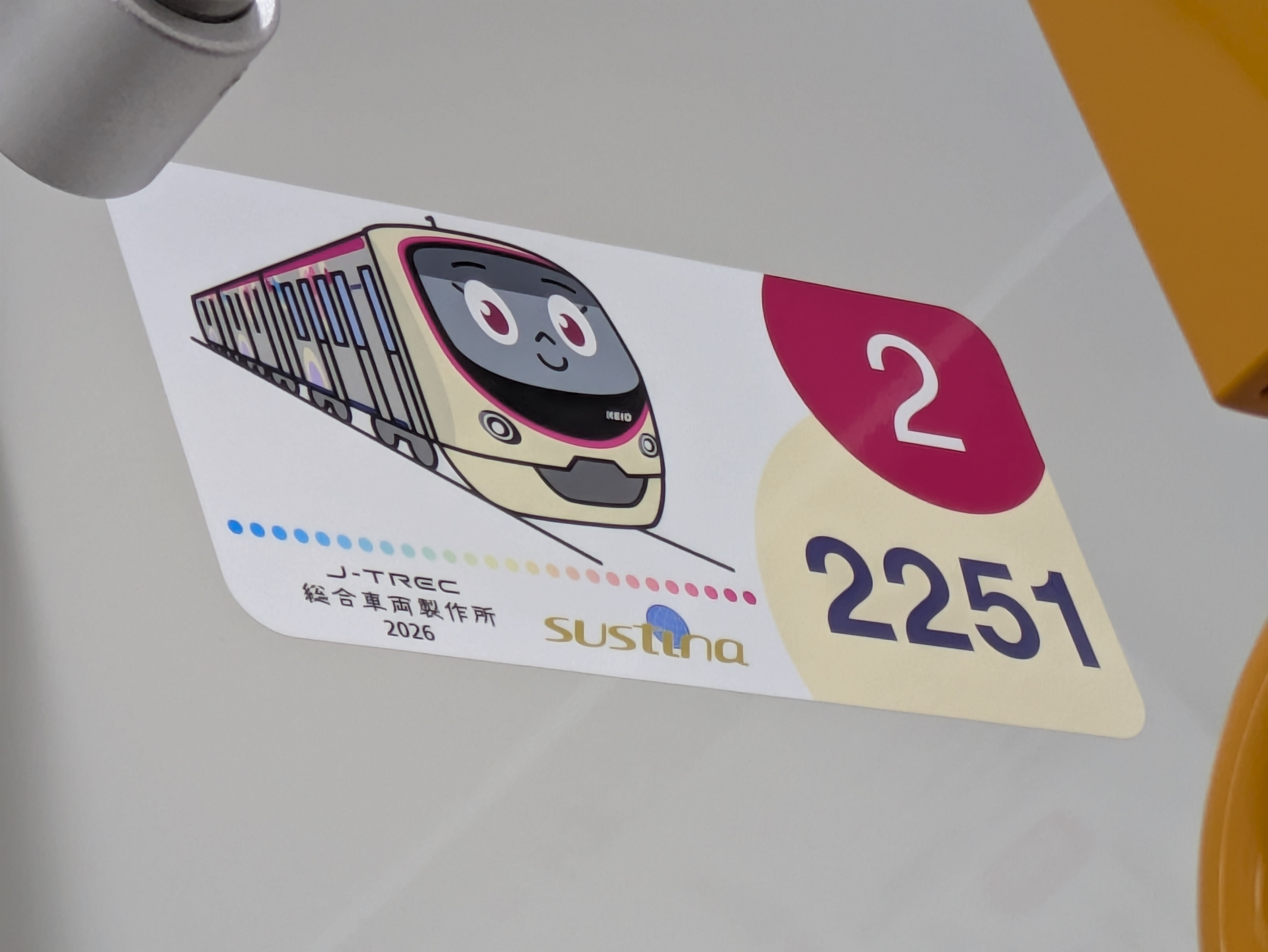
Manufacturer's plate

== History ==
Details of the 2000 series were first announced in May 2024. A total of four 10-car sets are to be manufactured by J-TREC by March 2027. These trains use variable-frequency drive (VVVF) inverters with silicon carbide (SiC) components, which brings down energy consumption by 20% compared to older 7000 series trains.

Following a vote held between 7 May and 10 June 2025 to determine the branding used for car 5's "free space", Keio announced on 30 September that the space would receive the name "Hidamari Space" (ひだまりスペース).

The first set, 2701, was delivered from the J-TREC factory at Yokohama in October 2025.

The 2000 series entered revenue service on 31 January 2026.

The second set, 2702, was delivered in February 2026 and entered service in March of that year.

The third set, 2703, was delivered in August 2026.
