= Lenovo Miix =

Line of convertible laptops

The Lenovo Miix was a series of multi-mode computing devices that function as both a tablet and a notebook computer.

== History ==
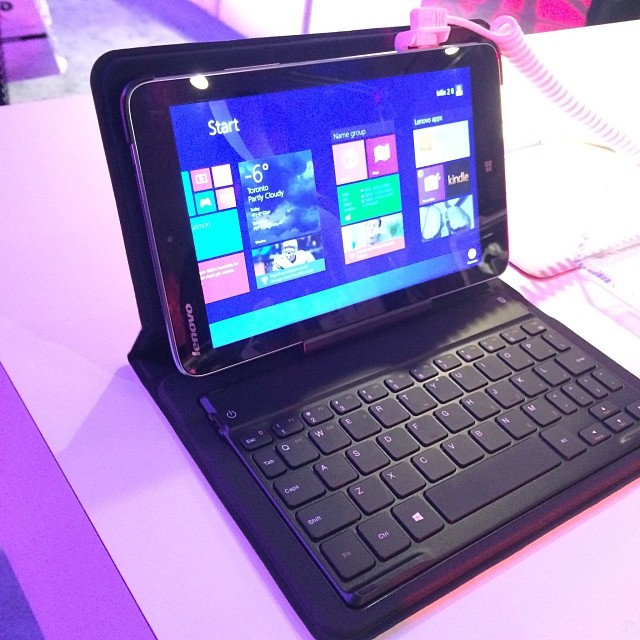
Lenovo MIIX 2

The first Miix was announced in June 2013. Lenovo said it would be released sometime during the summer of the same year. Lenovo said the device would be priced at approximately US$500. In October 2014, Lenovo launched an additional Miix tablet by the name Miix 2, which is an 8-inch Windows 8.1 tablet. The Miix 2 is powered by a 1.8 GHz Intel Atom processor. Lenovo stopped selling this tablet in July 2014 in the United States, citing "a low demand".

Discontinued in

== Models ==
=== Miix line ===
==== Miix 2 ====
Released ~2014, source:

==== Miix 3 ====
The Lenovo Miix 3-830 was launched in September 2014, with a 7.85-inch screen, 1024×768 pixel display, Windows 8.1, and an Intel Atom Z3735F processor.

Lenovo Miix 3-1030 then followed in October 2014, with a 10.1-inch screen, 1920×1200 pixel display, Windows 8.1, and an Intel Atom Z3745 processor.

==== Miix 320 ====
Miix Ideapad 310 superseded by Lenovo Miix 320 in 2017.

==== Miix 630 ====
Released in 2018, with ARM processor.

=== IdeaPad Miix line ===
Similar to another IdeaPad laptops branding with affordable 3## line, mainstream 5## line and expensive 7## line.

==== IdeaPad Miix 300 ====
Lenovo unveiled a Windows 8.1 tablet at Mobile World Congress, called the IdeaPad MIIX 300. It is a mid-size tablet, weighing at 0.8 lb (360 g), 0.4 inches (9.3 mm) thick, and length and width will be 5.1 in × 8.5 in (130 mm × 215 mm). According to preliminary reviews, other features include pixel density of about 188 ppi and has an IPS screen which supports wide viewing angles. It has a micro-USB port and an on-screen Windows button. Powered by a quad-core Atom Bay Trail chip, the MIIX 300 will provide 2 GB of RAM, and internal storage capacity will top out at 64 GB. It will come with Windows 8.1 with Bing and a year's subscription to Office 365. Battery life is around 7 hours for a single charge.

==== IdeaPad Miix 310 ====
During Mobile World Congress 2016 Lenovo presented the MIIX 310 - the Windows 10 tablet with a detachable keyboard, with Intel Atom X5 8300 or Z8350 processor and integrated graphics. 128 gigabytes of eMMC internal storage come standard. A 1080p display, cellular data in the form of 4G LTE, extra memory up to 2 gigabytes are available as upgrades. Lenovo claims the device achieves ten hours of battery life. 802.11b/g/n Wi-Fi comes standard.

==== IdeaPad Miix 520 ====
Released in 2017

==== IdeaPad Miix 700 ====
The IdeaPad Miix 700 is a released in 2016 hybrid device with a detachable soft keyboard cover, stylus, and kickstand. The kickstand is designed for multiple positions and allows the display height and angle to be adjusted. The Miix has a 2160 by 1440 pixel multitouch IPS display. The Miix 700 has one USB 3.0 port, one USB 2.0 port, a micro-HDMI port for video and audio out, a slot for LTE or 3G cellular data SIM cards, a microSD card slot for user expandable storage, and a combined headphone/microphone jack.

Business Edition - The Business Edition is a variant of the Miix 700. It is also a hybrid device with same display. It weighs 3.2 pounds with the keyboard attached. It is available with various Intel Core M processors with the most powerful being the Core m7. It comes with as much as 8 GiB of RAM and a 256 GB SATA SSD. The main feature that distinguishes the Business Edition from the standard Miix 700 is its Trusted Platform Module chip that works with bundled software to provide "enterprise-level" security.

==== IdeaPad Miix 10 Tablet ====
The released in 2013 Miix 10 has a 10.1-inch touchscreen with a resolution of 1366 × 768 that supports five touch points. It is powered by a dual-core "Clover Trail" Intel Atom processor, comes with 64 GB of eMMC SSD that can be supplemented with up 32 GB more storage using a microSD card, 2 GB of LP-DDR2 RAM, and runs Microsoft Windows 8. Bluetooth 4.0 and Wi-Fi networking come standard. 3G cellular data and GPS are optional. The Miix gets its multi-mode functionality from its "quick-flip" detachable folio keyboard that allows it to quickly switch from PC mode to tablet mode. The device weights only 1.2 pounds and has a battery Lenovo claims will last 10 hours. The battery has 6800 mAh capacity and uses Li-Pol technology. The Miix has a 1 megapixel front-facing camera for chat and stereo speakers.

== Reviews ==
In a review for PC Pro, Barry Collins wrote, "So what to make of the Miix 10? It has several advantages over the Surface Pro, not least when it comes to paying off the credit card bill at the end of the month. The absence of a touchpad or stylus is a major oversight, and renders the Windows desktop near inoperable without outside assistance from a Bluetooth mouse, which adds to the weight and cost. Yet we remain enamoured with Lenovo's Miix 10. It’s a capable performer for work, and for sitting back on the sofa and keeping an eye on Twitter feeds, and it's light enough for both purposes. It falls short of an award, but by a margin slimmer than its slender frame."

== See also ==
- IdeaPad
- Microsoft Surface Pro
