= Choshi Electric Railway 300 series =

Class of 1 Japanese electric railcar

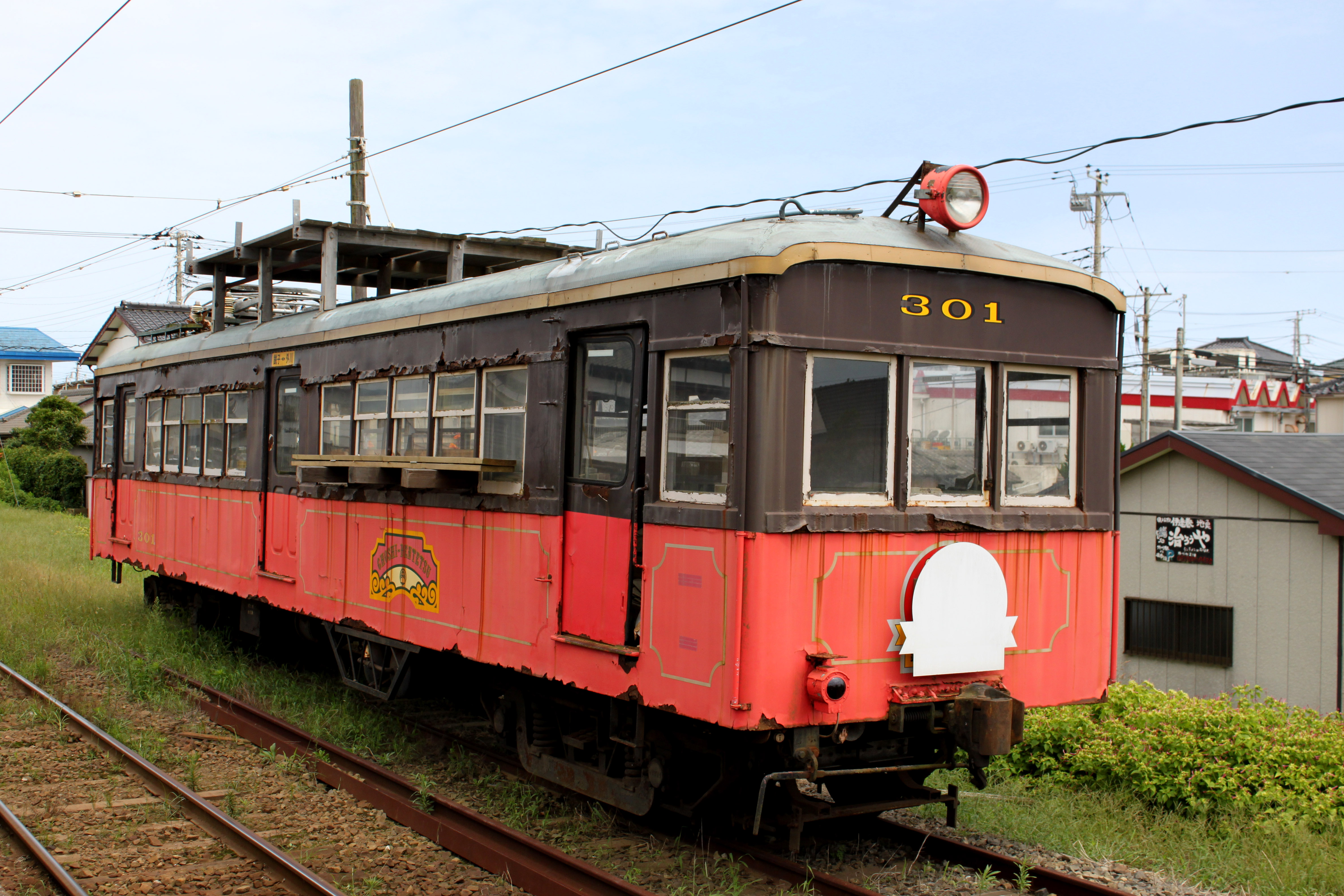
- DeHa 301 stored at Tokawa Station, August 2009
- In service: 1951–2008
- Manufacturer: Niigata Tekkō
- Constructed: 1930
- Refurbished: 1951
- Scrapped: 2009
- Number built: 1 vehicle
- Number in service: None
- Number scrapped: 1 vehicle
- Formation: Single car
- Fleet numbers: DeHa 301
- Capacity: 100 (40 seated)
- Operator: Choshi Electric Railway
- Depot: Nakanochō

Specifications
- Car body construction: Steel/wood
- Car length: 15,545 mm (51 ft 0 in)
- Width: 2,680 mm (8 ft 10 in)
- Height: 4,143 mm (13 ft 7.1 in)
- Doors: 3 per side
- Weight: 28.2 t
- Traction system: MB-64-C (48.49 kW x2)
- Power output: 97 kW
- Electric systems: 600 V DC overhead wire
- Current collection: PS13 pantograph (x1)
- Bogies: Nippon Sharyo D-16
- Track gauge: 1,067 mm (3 ft 6 in)

The Choshi Electric Railway 300 series (銚子電鉄300形, Chōshi Dentetsu 300-gata) was an electric multiple unit (EMU) train type operated by the private railway operator Choshi Electric Railway in Chiba Prefecture, Japan, between 1951 and 2008.

== Build details ==
No.	Former No.	Manufacturer	Build date	Withdrawal date
DeHa 301	MoHa 105, later MoHa 115	Niigata Tekkō	August 1930	October 2009

== History ==
DeHa 301 started life as MoHa 105, an electric multiple unit car built in August 1930 by Niigata Tekkō (新潟鐵工所; now Niigata Transys) for the Tsurumi Rinkō Railway (鶴見臨港鉄道; now the JR Tsurumi Line) in Kanagawa Prefecture. MoHa 105 was renumbered MoHa 115 in May 1941 following the absorption of the Tsurumi Rinkō Railway into the Japanese National Railways (JNR) network, and later worked on the JNR Toyamako Line (now part of the Toyama Light Rail Toyamakō Line) in Toyama Prefecture. It was removed from service on 10 September 1944 and placed into storage at Ōi Works in Tokyo, and officially withdrawn on 28 March 1949.

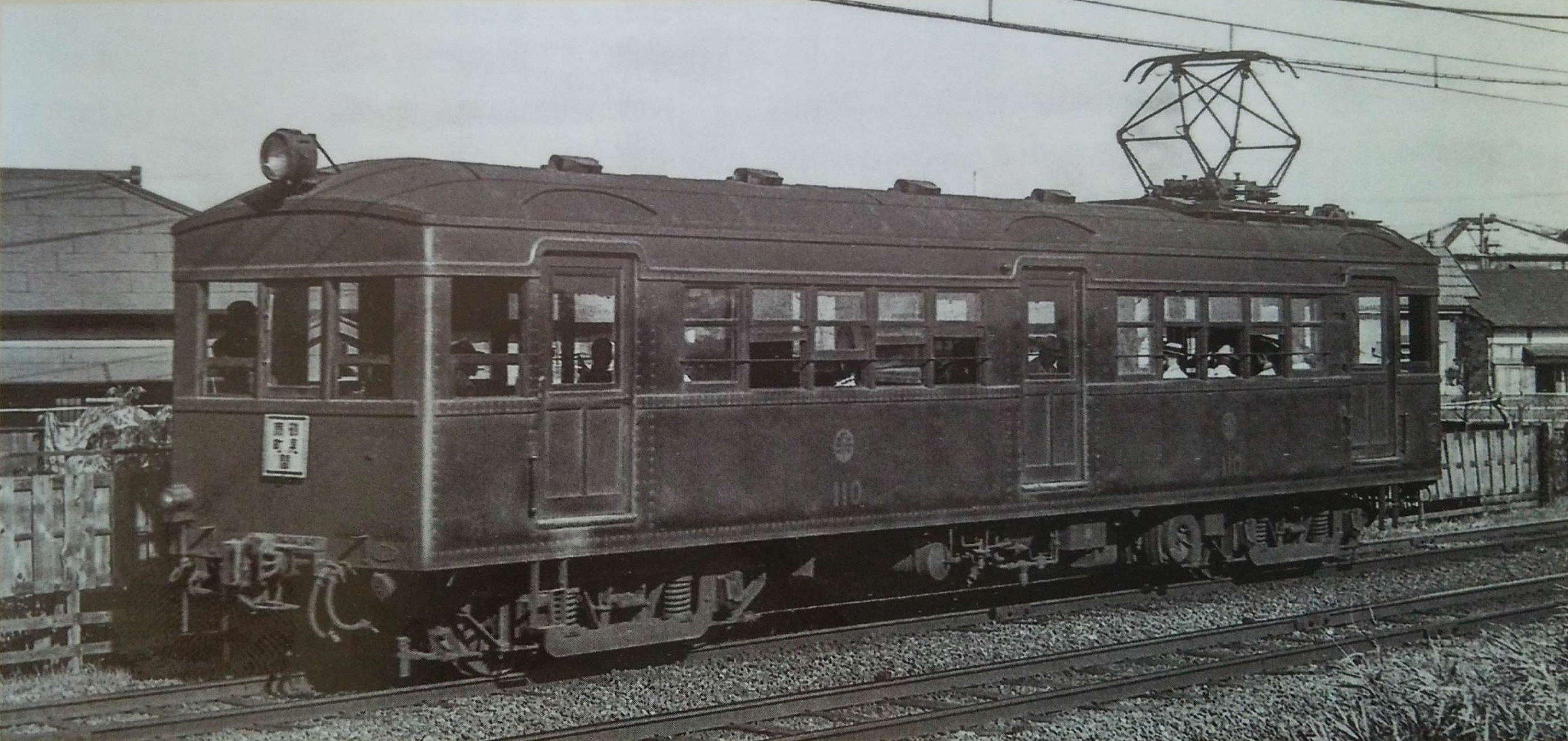
Tsurumi Rinko Railway MoHa 110 (similar to MoHa 105) in 1939

The car was subsequently purchased by the Choshi Electric Railway, and rebuilt by Nippon Tetsudō Jidōsha Kōgyō (日本鉄道自動車工業; present-day Toyokouki) before entering service on the line from 10 August 1951.

The trolley pole current collector added on transfer to the Choshi Electric Railway was later replaced by a bow collector, and this was replaced by a PS13 lozenge-type pantograph from April 1990.

The original Kisha BW bogies were replaced in 1984 by Nippon Sharyo D-16 bogies from former Iyo Railway rolling stock.

In later years, it was used as an inspection and works train for overhead wire maintenance, with a platform added to the roof.

The car was withdrawn in fiscal 2008 and stored at Tokawa Station before being cut up in October 2009.

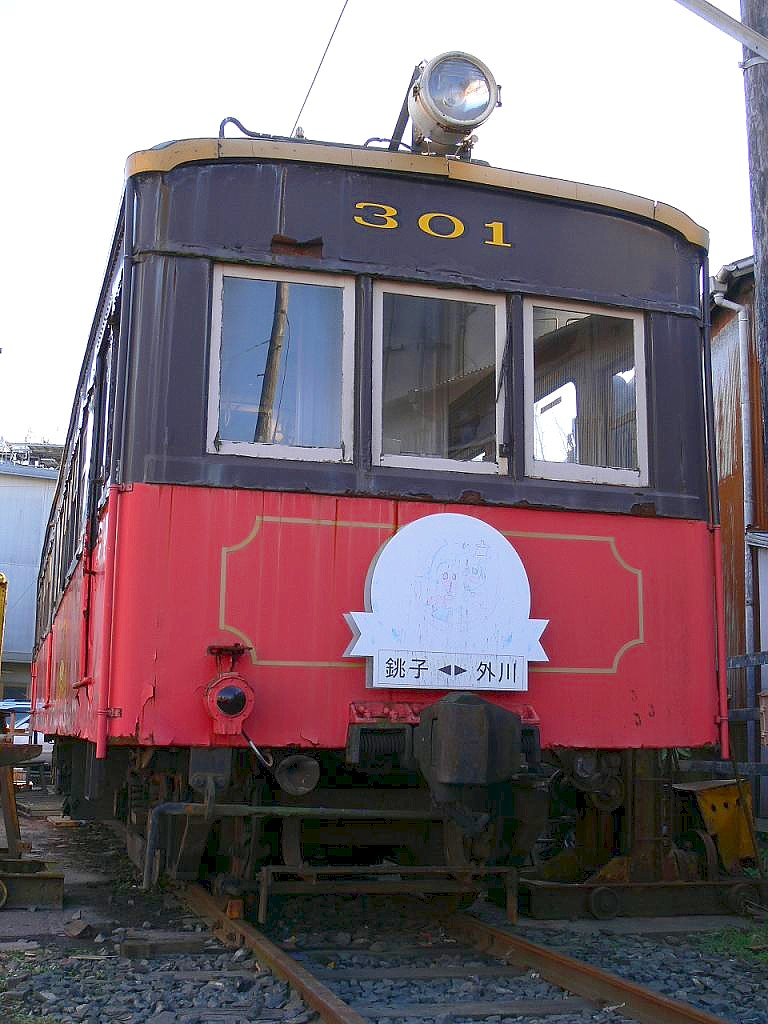
DeHa 301 at Nakanochō Depot, January 2007
