= DAF F218 series =

DAF F218/F220
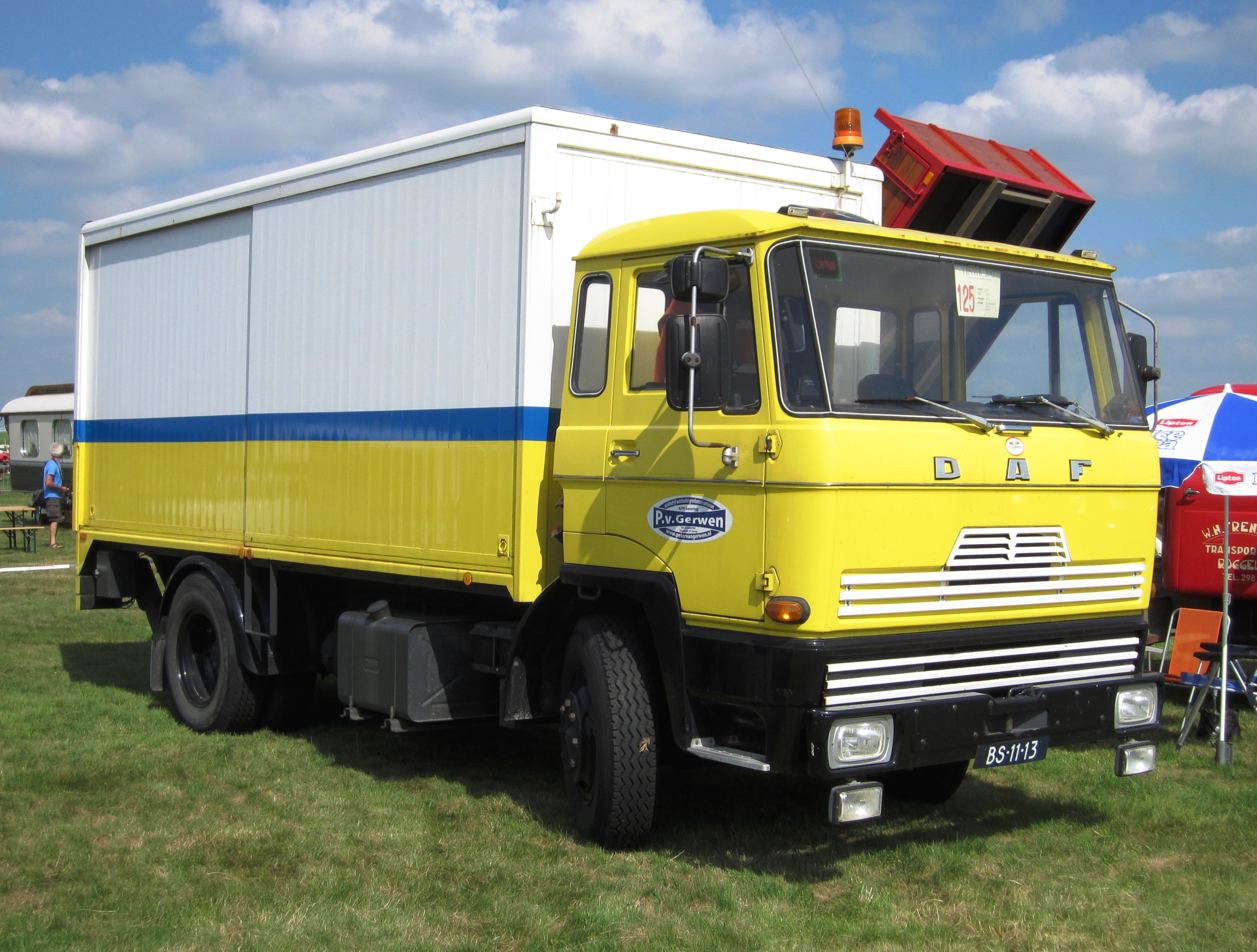
- 1971 DAF F1600

Overview
- Manufacturer: DAF Trucks
- Also called: DAF F1600/2000/2200 (F218); DAF F1200/1400 (F198); DAF F1600/1700/1800/1900 (F220); DAF F2100/2300/2500/2700 (F220)
- Production: 1970-1995
- Assembly: Eindhoven, Netherlands

Body and chassis
- Class: Heavy truck
- Related: DAF F198 series; DAF F241 series

Powertrain
- Engine: 5.8 L DD575 diesel I6; 6.2 L 620/NS/NT diesel I6; 8.25 L DHx 825 diesel I6

Chronology
- Predecessor: DAF A-series
- Successor: DAF 65/75/85

The DAF F218 and later F220 is the name of a modular cab used on a series of medium-duty trucks produced by the Dutch manufacturer DAF from early 1970 until the mid-1990s. The names reflect the cab width in centimetres, at 218 and 220 cm (85.8 and 86.6 in) respectively. DAF's first tilting cab design, all in steel, it also benefitted from a new 8.25 L (503 cu in) diesel inline-six. After a thorough facelift with a new front clip in the style of the larger F241 series, the cab was renamed the F220 in 1976. The range was originally sold as the F1600 or F2000, with the new model F220 marketed as the F2300. Gradually, a number of other iterations appeared, with the range eventually stretching from the 1700 to the intercooled 2700 ATi.

== History ==
=== F218 ===
Introduced in early 1970, the DAF F1600 and F2000 were all-new and tilted for ease of access. The cab used standard pressings and was designed so as to easily allow for a large number of variations to be developed. Both rigids and tractors were offered from the get go. The new 8.25 liter cross-flow six-cylinder diesel was offered in naturally aspirated (DH825) or turbocharged (DHB825) forms, with either 163 or 218 PS (120 or 160 kW) SAE. In 1972, the heavier-duty (32 tons GVW) F2200 appeared, with three versions of the 825 engine with power ranging from 180 to 230 PS (132 to 169 kW). The more powerful models showed the strongest sales.

=== F198 ===
The narrower yet, at 198 cm (78.0 in), F198 cab arrived in 1972. It was available as the F1200 or the F1400 and was meant for light duty work. This version was short-lived, being replaced in 1975 by DAF's new 500-1300 range which used the all new Club of Four cab, built by Magirus in Ulm, Germany. The F1200 has a 4770 cc inline-six engine with 74 kW (100 PS). The larger F1400 receives the 5760 cc DD575 diesel motor with 110 PS (81 kW) DIN at 2400 rpm. The range seems to have been produced for another few years in small numbers, until around 1978 (when the heavier F1300 and F1500 Club of Four models were introduced).

=== F220 ===
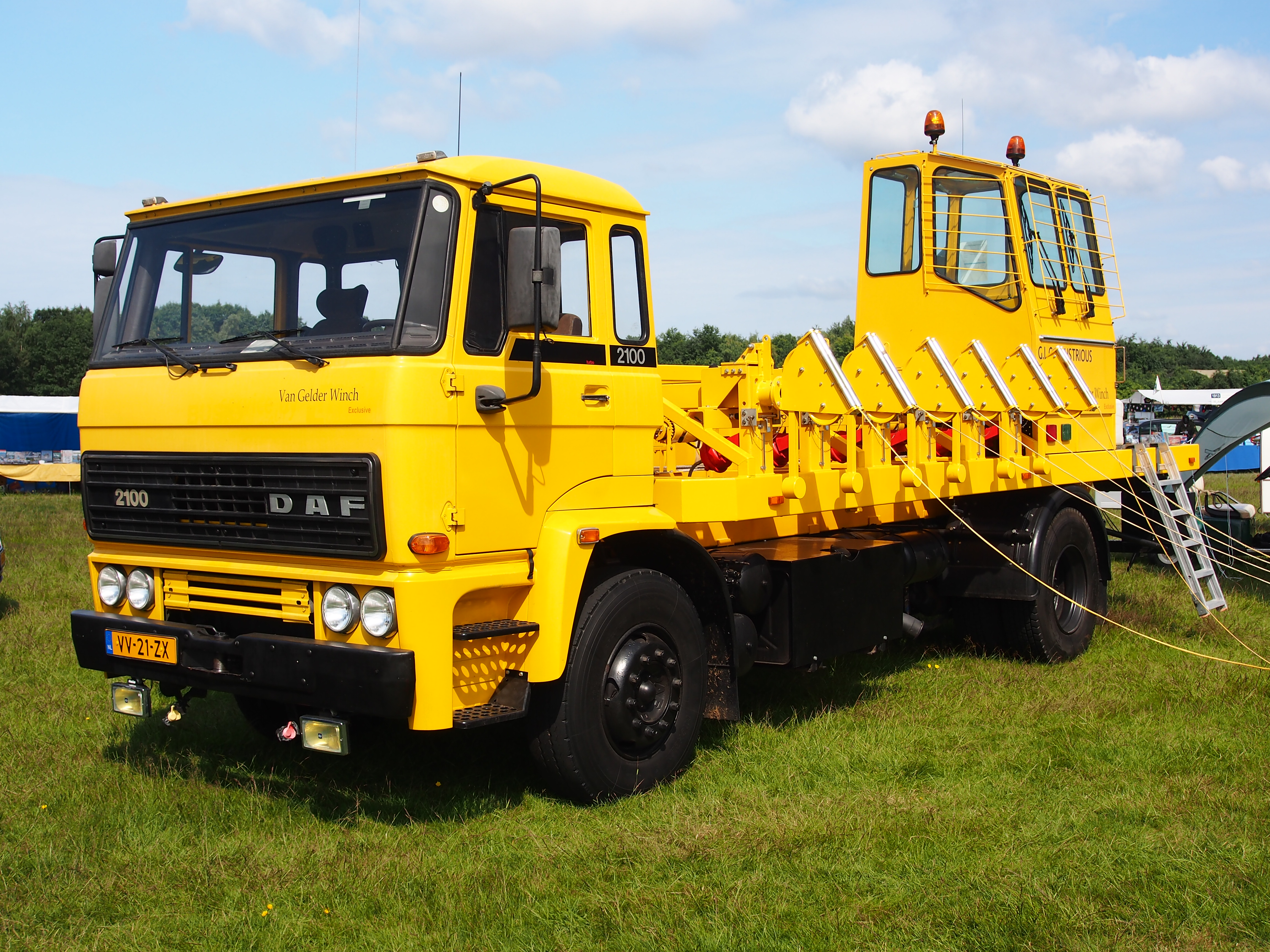
1983 DAF FA 2105

In 1976, at the Earl's Court Commercial Motor Show, the F2300 appeared. This model had been developed due to pressure from the British sales network, and DAF, seeing a sales potential in Europe as well, was happy to oblige. The facelifted 2300 received an all new front appearance, looking like a smaller version of the DAF 2800 (which is exactly what it was). The 2300 was available with two, three, or four axles. The new cab design was called the F220. It replaced the F2200, and soon thereafter a series of smaller variations appeared, replacing the old F218 cabs entirely. Either a short or a sleeper design were available. The heavier 2100 and up models have twin round headlights mounted down low, while the lighter F1600 and 1800 have single rectangular headlamps mounted in the bumper.

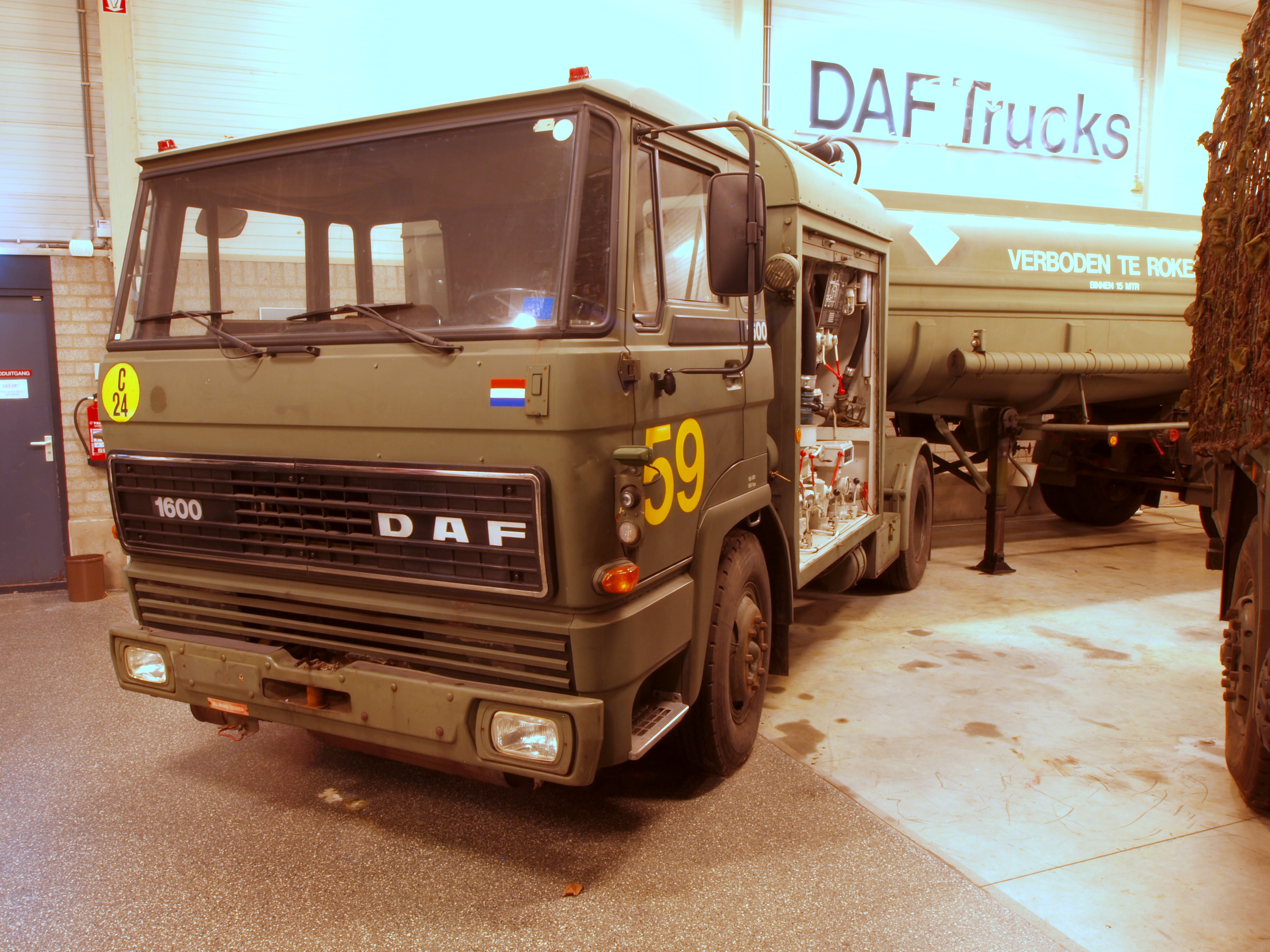
DAF F1600 tanker

A choice of six-, nine-, or twelve-speed manual transmissions were on offer for the 2300, while the smaller 2100 received six-speed transmissions with or without synchronization. Engine options were 155 or 169 kW (211 or 230 PS) for the 2300 (with an intercooler for the more powerful model) and 116.5 or 150 kW (158 or 204 PS) for the 2100, depending on whether the 825 was normally aspirated or turbocharged. The 2300's cabin was mounted 40 mm higher than on the old 2200 (F218) to allow room for the intercooler plumbing, requiring extra grab handles on the door pillar. The 2300 was a considerable success in the United Kingdom, where it outsold bigger brother 2800 and made DAF a name to be reckoned with. In the early months of 1982, the DAF F2500 arrived. A fettled version of the intercooled 2300 engine provided 250 PS (184 kW) at 2400 rpm and 915 N⋅m (675 lb⋅ft). The power delivery was somewhat peaky, meaning that multiple gears were a necessity. Standard fitment was the six-speed S.6-90 transmission with a splitter for twelve total gears, and a sixteen-speed "Ecosplit" ZF 16S112 was an available option. As with the 2300, the 2500 was available with a short or a sleeper cab, two to four axles, as tractors or as rigid trucks. The more powerful engine made it more fuel efficient than the 2300 as well as quicker and easier to drive.

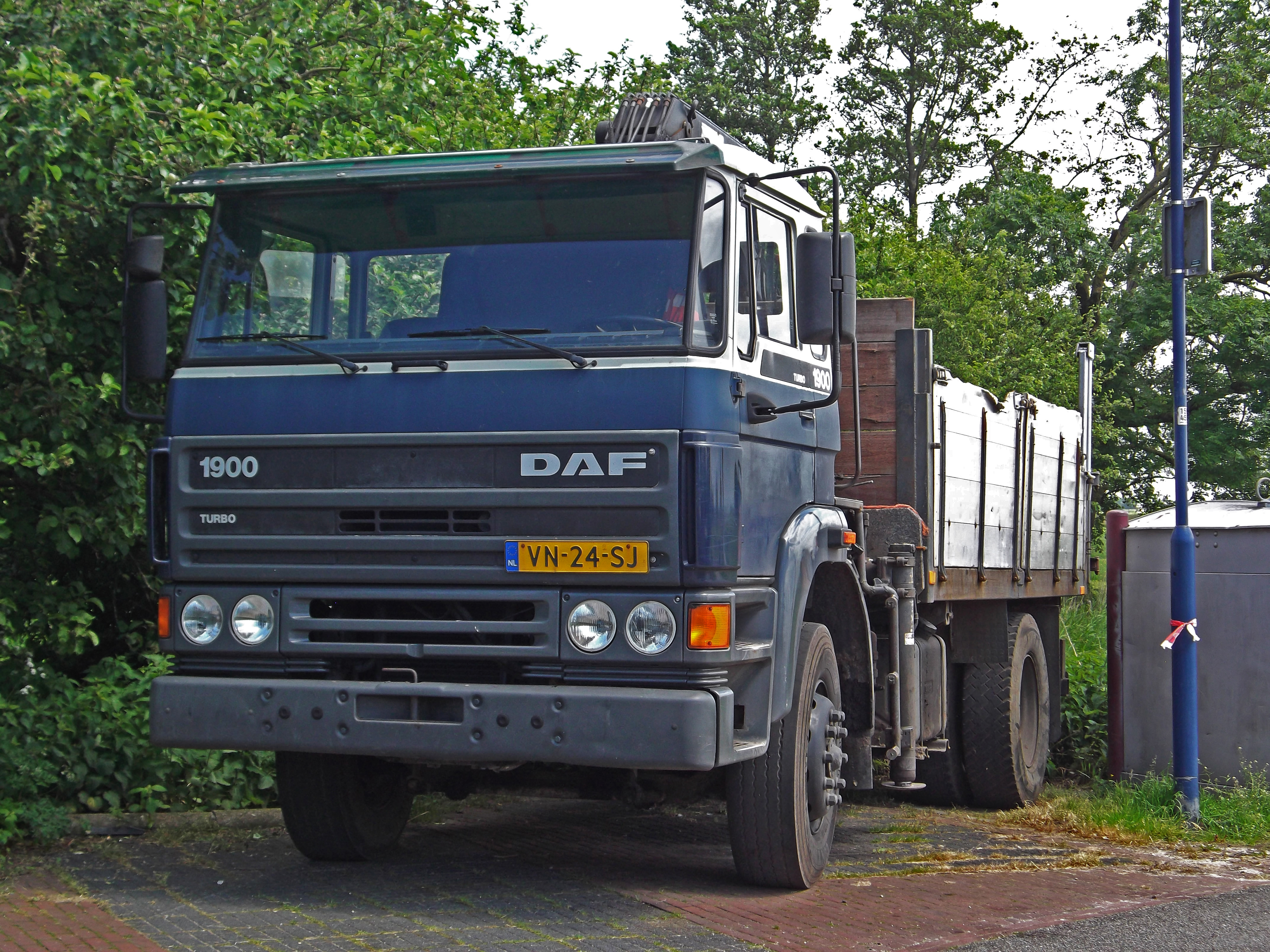
DAF 1900, post-1987 facelift model

==== Facelift ====
The F1600 and F1800 were replaced by the modernized 1700 and 1900 in 1987; their front continued DAF's new family design as introduced with the new 95. This facelift also found its way onto the 2100, 2300, and 2500 models. At the Auto RAI in Amsterdam 1989, the new ATi-engined 2700 appeared, supplanting the 2500 in many markets. As for the 2500, the 2700 was designed for inter-regional use, rather than for real long-distance work. While more modern, the nearly twenty years old cab design was beginning to show its age, with questionable ergonomics and a small front windscreen. The new HS 200 ATi engine received DAF's new "Advanced Turbocharged Intercooling" and produces 272 PS (200 kW), a very high specific output for the time.

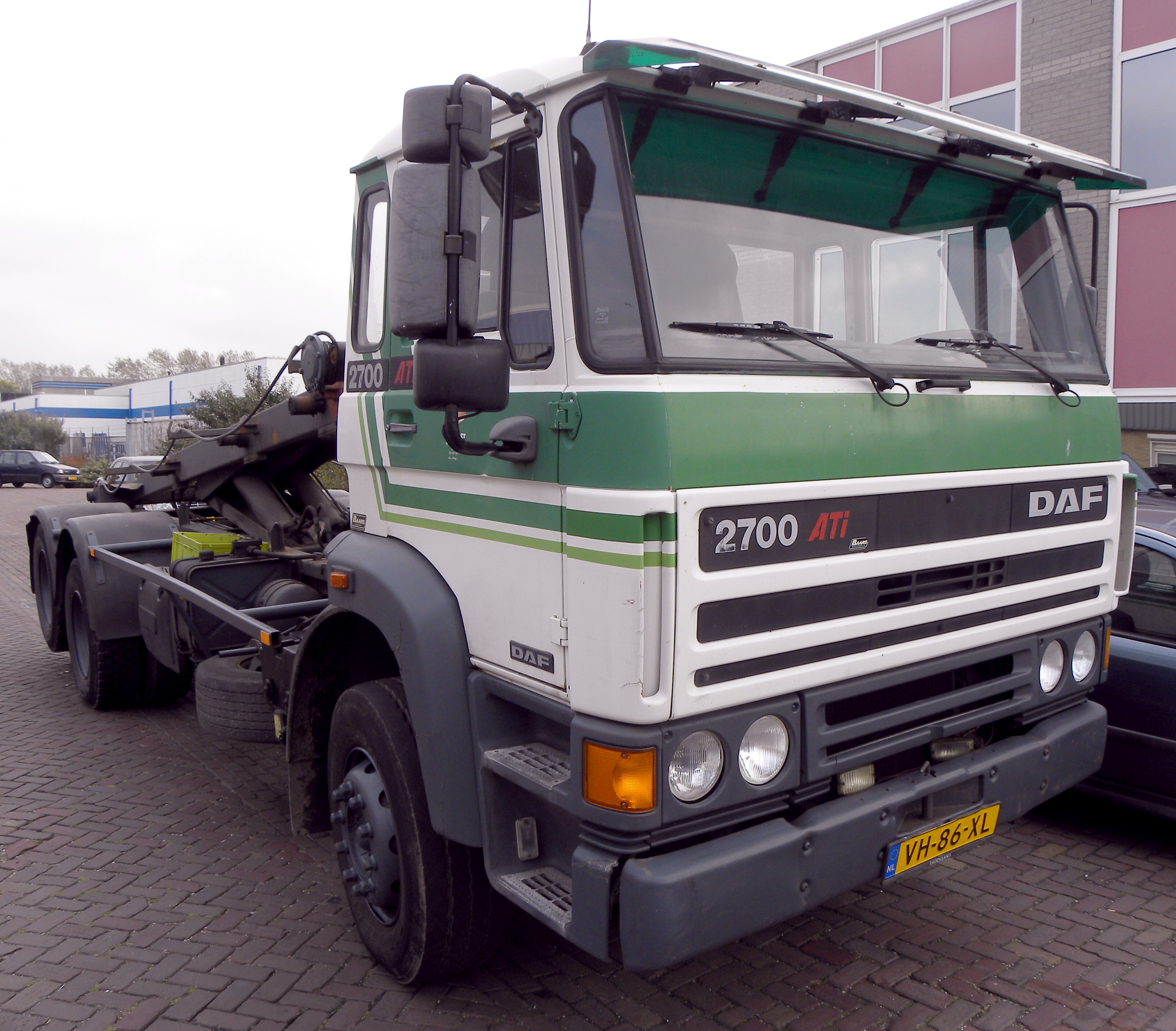
1990 DAF 2700 ATi tractor

After the 1987 merger of Leyland and DAF, the 2300 and 2700 series replaced the Leyland (T45) Cruiser in the British market.

The F218 and F220 cabs were also used for a number of military vehicles provided to the Dutch Armed Forces from 1976 into the 21st century. Originally as the YA-4440 rigid, other models are the 5441, 4442, 5442. Tractors are called YAV/YAZ-2300.
