= 200th (Winnipeg) Battalion, CEF =

The 200th Battalion, CEF, was a unit in the Canadian Expeditionary Force during the First World War. Based in Winnipeg, Manitoba, it began recruiting during the winter of 1915/16. After sailing to England, it was absorbed into the 11th Reserve Battalion on May 14, 1917. It had one commanding officer: Lieutenant Colonel A. L. Bonnycastle.
