= 818th Tank Destroyer Battalion =

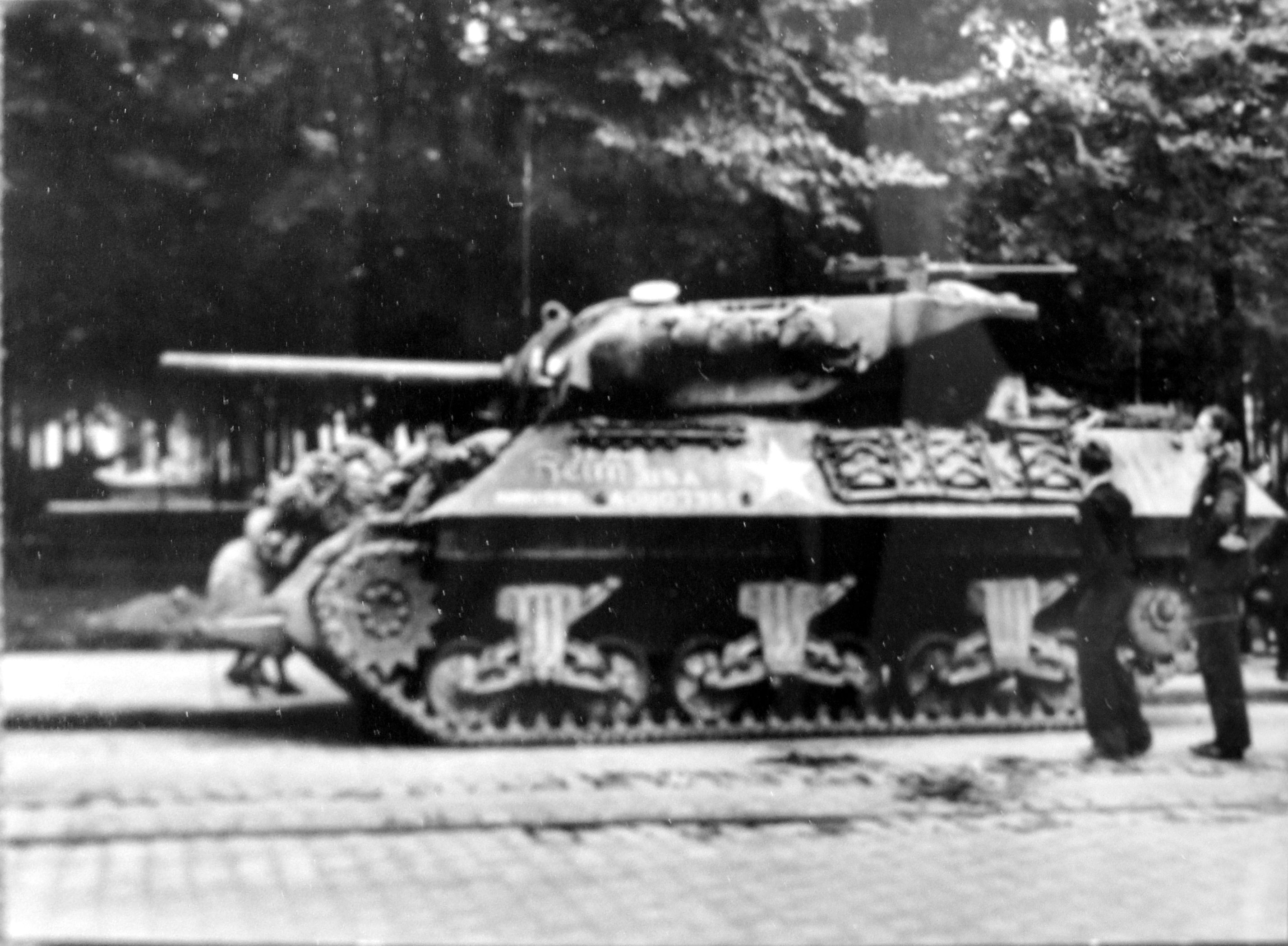
- Tank destroyer of the 818th TD Bn in Reims, France
- Active: 1941–1945, 1947–1950
- Disbanded: 1945
- Country: United States
- Branch: United States Army
- Part of: Independent unit
- Equipment: M10 GMC; M36 GMC
- Campaigns: World War II: Normandy; Northern France; Rhineland; Ardennes-Alsace; Central Europe
- Decorations: Distinguished Unit Citation (1st Platoon, A Company)

The 818th Tank Destroyer Battalion was a tank destroyer battalion of the United States Army active during World War II. It first saw combat in July 1944, when it deployed into the Normandy beachhead in preparation for the breakout into France by Lieutenant General George Patton's Third Army. Working closely with the 5th Infantry Division, it moved through northern France up to the Moselle region, where it was involved in the Battle for Metz through September, October and November. In December, it disengaged from defensive positions along the German border and was moved north to fight in the Battle of the Bulge with the 26th Infantry Division. After securing the Allied flanks and mopping up the Bulge, it refitted for two months before fighting south along the Siegfried Line and crossing the Rhine in March. In April and early May, it rushed through southern Germany into Austria and Czechoslovakia, where it ended the war. After a brief spell of occupation duties, it was returned to the United States and disbanded in November. During the European campaign, the battalion lost a total twenty-six men and eight tank destroyers in combat.

== Formation ==
The battalion was activated on 15 December 1941, in line with the reorganization of the anti-tank force, at Fort Sill, Oklahoma. It was formed from the 18th Provisional Anti-Tank Battalion, which had been drawn from the 77th, 142d and 349th Field Artillery Regiments, and the 71st, 72d and 83d Field Artillery Battalions. It moved to Camp Bowie, Texas, early in the following year, and in June moved to the Tank Destroyer Center at Camp Hood. Whilst training there, it detached a cadre to form the 820th Tank Destroyer Battalion.

After a series of training posts in Louisiana, Virginia and New Jersey, the battalion was shipped out of New York aboard the USS Fairisle in October 1943, to be stationed in Northern Ireland. In May 1944, as part of the buildup to the Normandy landings, they were moved to a transit camp in Wiltshire, south-west England. The unit was organized as a self-propelled battalion, equipped with M10 GMC tank destroyers.

== France ==
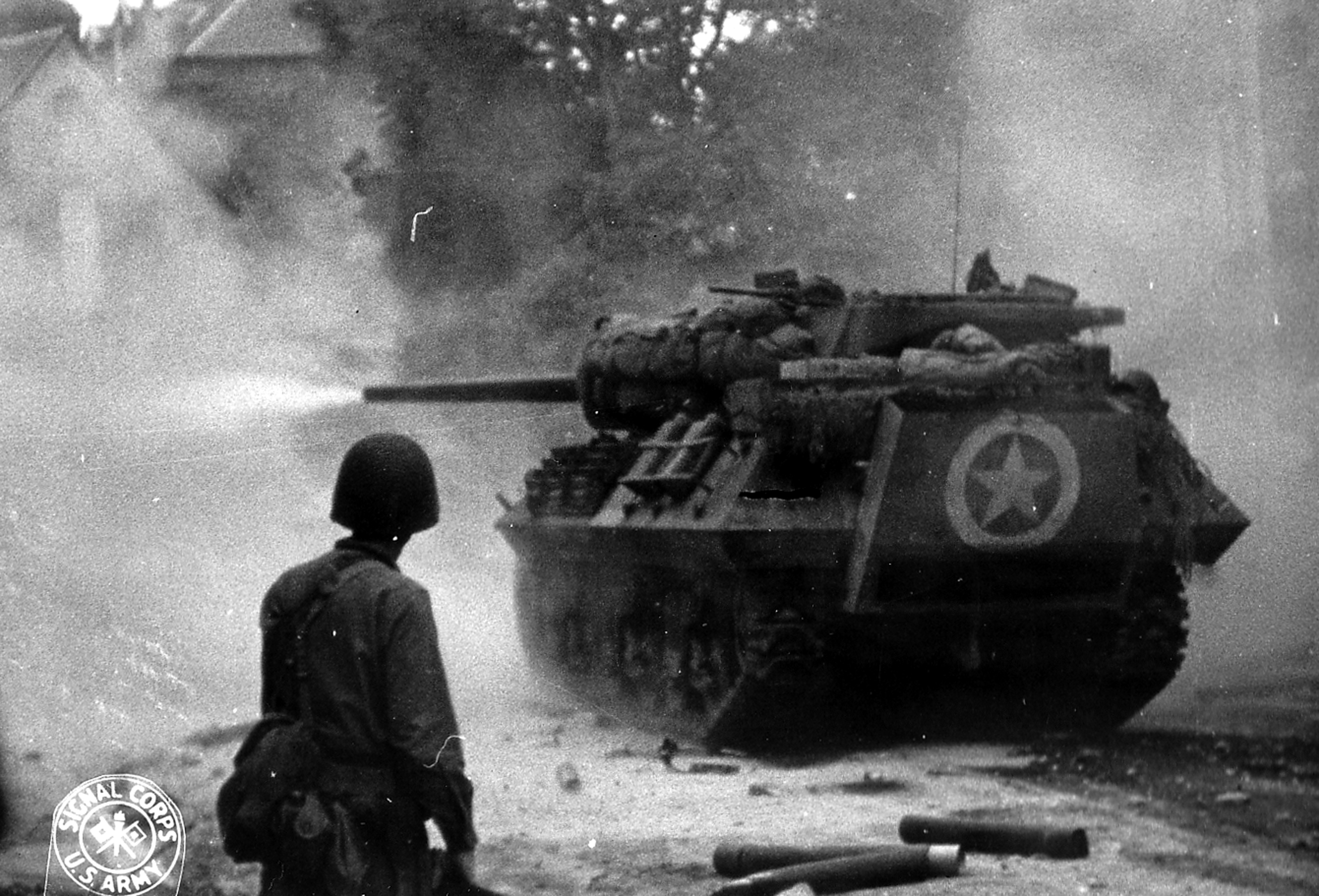
A M10 in action during the Normandy breakout

The 818th landed in Normandy on the evening of 14 July, coming ashore at Utah Beach, and were attached to the 5th Infantry Division, which had arrived in Normandy a few days earlier. The first companies moved into line on 16 July, relieving the crews of the 635th Tank Destroyer Battalion, and fired their first shots in the early morning of 18 July. The battalion had its first fatality the next day, when an NCO was accidentally shot by a guard. Limited supporting fire missions continued through the month, with one company deployed in close support of an infantry attack on 26 July. This was the opening of Operation Cobra, the breakout from Normandy; whilst the 5th Division was deployed on the far left of the US lines and was not directly involved in the offensive, it began to move forward quickly as the German lines retreated. On 1 August, the division was withdrawn from First Army, which was turning to flank the German forces, and assigned to Third Army, which was assigned to the wide sweep through France. Moving forward with the offensive, the battalion supported the capture of Angers on 11 August, and on 13 August liberated a camp of over a hundred American airmen who had been shot down over France and evaded or escaped captivity. They supported the capture of Chartres, to the south of Paris, on 15 August, and continued to push east, reaching the River Seine on 27 August. The battalion then crossed the River Marne and arrived at Reims on 30 August, resting for a short while before resuming the advance.

In early September, the 5th Division probed through Verdun towards Metz; Company C of the 818th supported an unsuccessful attempt to bridge the Moselle at Dornot, but was held in reserve and did not see significant action before the bridgehead was withdrawn. A second attack, at Arnaville south of the city on 10 September, was supported by B Company; the M10s were held back on the western bank of the river, placed on a bluff with good views over the bridgehead to the east. From here, they could support the infantry directly. Two platoons were brought over the river on a temporary bridge the next day, the first armored support available to the attack. After the bridgehead was safely established, the 5th Division moved against Metz in the first phases of the Battle of Metz. After supporting an attack on the outer fortifications was beaten back on 27 September – the 818th discovering to its cost that its guns were ineffective against large-scale fortifications – they remained in defensive positions here until early November, with a brief break in late October to re-equip and rest. The 5th Division and elements of the 818th began the final attack on Metz on 10 November, clearing the city by the end of the month and moving east across the German border.

== Ardennes and Germany ==
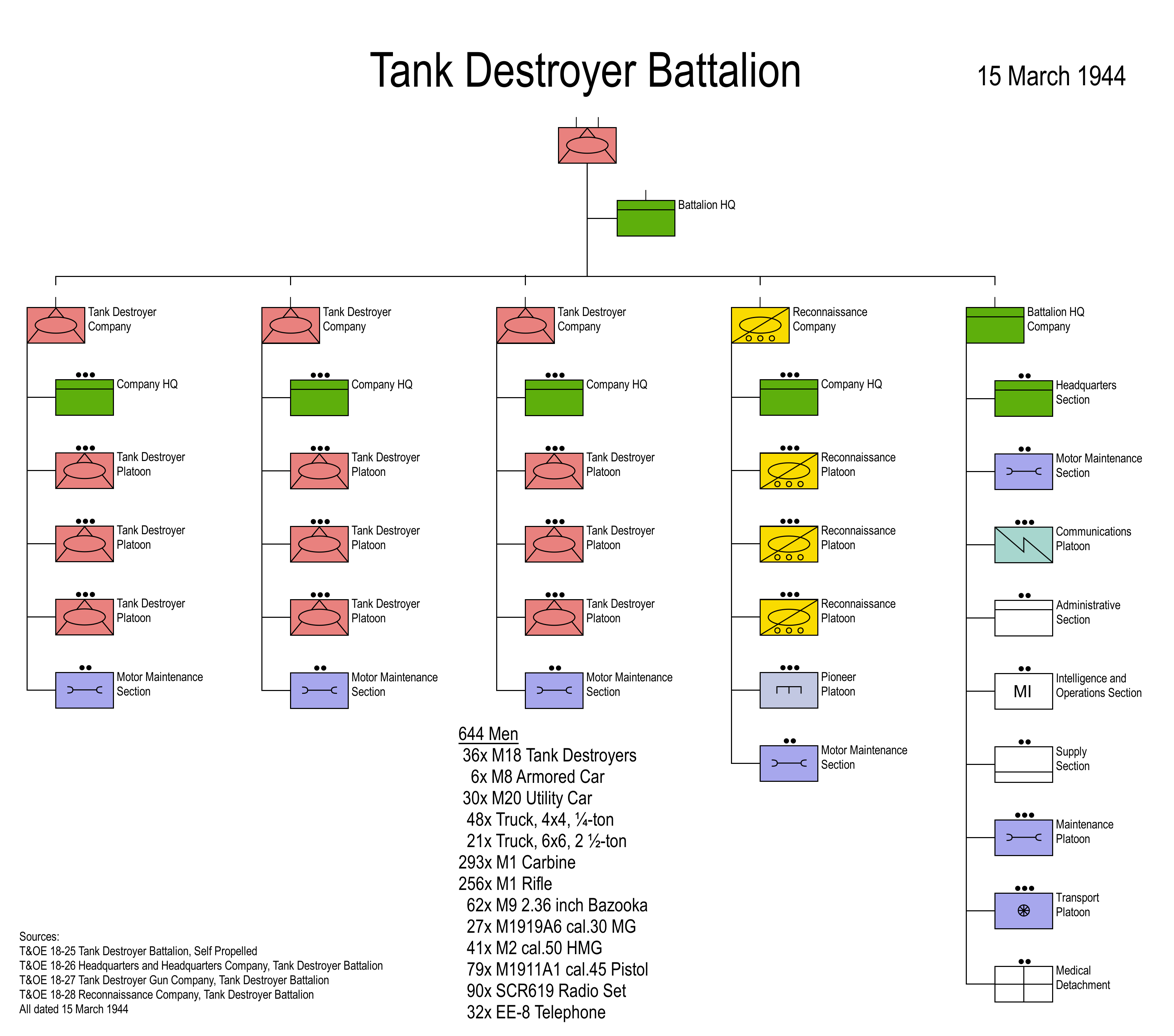
Tank Destroyer Battalion (SP) Structure - March 1944

The 818th supported the 5th Division in fighting around Saarlautern until 19 December, when it was ordered to disengage and move into reserve in response to the German attack in the Ardennes. It was assigned to join the 26th Infantry Division on 21 December; this division had been held in reserve near Metz to refit, and was now being sent north to hold the southern flank of the German offensive as part of III Corps. For the next ten days, the battalion pressed north, with the companies split up among the divisional infantry regiments, until they came to a standstill in Luxembourg at the end of the month. They remained in the line until 27 January, when the division was relieved and returned to the Saarlautern bridgehead. This proved to be a quiet sector; whilst remaining in defensive positions, the crews were able to rest and repair their equipment, There were no significant attacks through February, with most activity coming from indirect fire missions and from firing at pillboxes on the far side of the Saar. In February, new M36 GMC tank destroyers arrived, and the battalion re-equipped with the new vehicles. The M36 was a development of the M10; it used the same hull and engine, but mounted a larger turret housing a substantially more powerful 90mm gun; in some situations, it was capable of destroying an enemy tank at more than two and a half miles (around 4 km).

In early March, the division moved to Saarburg, and began its attack along the Siegfried Line on 13 March. As had become routine by this point, the companies of the 818th operated separately, in close contact with the division's infantry regiments; they broke through the line on 18 March, and pressed eastwards towards the Rhine. During the later stages of the advance, the battalion headquarters formed an ad hoc group (Task Force Hail) to screen the southern flank of the division, commanding the battalion reconnaissance company and an infantry company from the division. They reached the Rhine on 25 March, and crossed the same night; the advance continued unbroken for several days. Moving ahead by leaps and bounds, the battalion had approached the Czech border by 16 April, turning south towards Austria and the Alps. In the last days of the war, the forward elements entered Linz and moved north into Czechoslovakia itself.

== Demobilization and later service ==
Following VE-Day on 7 May, the battalion was tasked with guarding German prisoners, slowly transitioning to more general occupation duties before being withdrawn to Germany in late July to prepare for demobilization. The battalion was eventually shipped to New York three months later, where it was finally inactivated on 30 October. During its 297 days on active service, it had lost twenty-three men killed on active service, along with eight tank destroyers (four M10s and four M36s). In return, it had destroyed twenty-three German tanks (one a Tiger heavy tank) and ten self-propelled guns, along with a large number of light vehicles and fixed positions, this was around average for a tank destroyer battalion, with perhaps lighter than usual casualties. During the war, men of the battalion were awarded nine Silver Stars and seventy-two Bronze Stars, whilst two more men were awarded the French Croix de Guerre. The battalion as a whole was mentioned in the Belgian Army orders of the day for its service in the Ardennes, whilst the Distinguished Unit Citation was awarded to the 1st Platoon, Company A, for its service.

The battalion was redesignated the 323d Mechanized Cavalry Reconnaissance Squadron in early 1947, and activated as part of the Organized Reserves; it was later reorganized as the 1st Battalion, 300th Armored Cavalry Regiment, and stood down from reserve status in 1950. It was later redesignated the 818th Tank Battalion, and assigned on paper to an inactive armored division in the Regular Army.
