= DAF F241 series =

DAF F241 Series
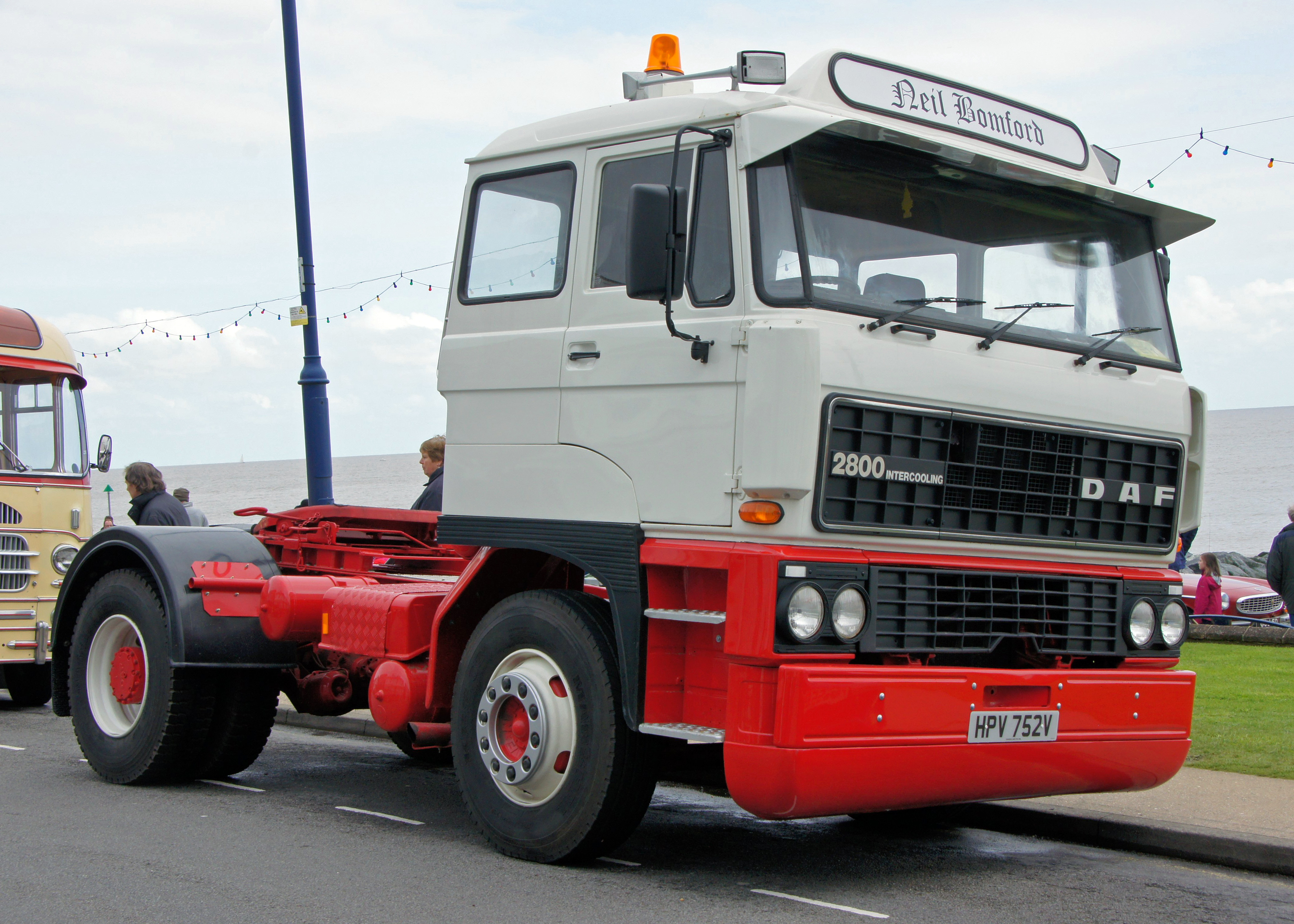
- A 1979 DAF 2800

Overview
- Manufacturer: DAF Trucks
- Also called: DAF 2800/2900/3200/3300/3600
- Production: 1973-1995
- Assembly: Eindhoven, Netherlands

Body and chassis
- Class: Heavy truck
- Related: DAF F218 series; DAF F220 series

Powertrain
- Engine: 11.6 L DAF 1160 td I6

Chronology
- Predecessor: DAF 2600
- Successor: DAF 95

The DAF F241 series is the name of a cab used on a series of heavy-duty, mostly long distance trucks produced by the Dutch manufacturer DAF from 1973 until 1994. They are better known as the DAF 2800, 3300 and 3600. The cab was a wider development of the F218, DAF's first tilt cab placed on among others 2500. The names reflect the cab width in centimetres, at 218 and 241 cm (86 and 95 in) respectively. The cab was also used by Hungary's RÁBA for various applications.

== History ==
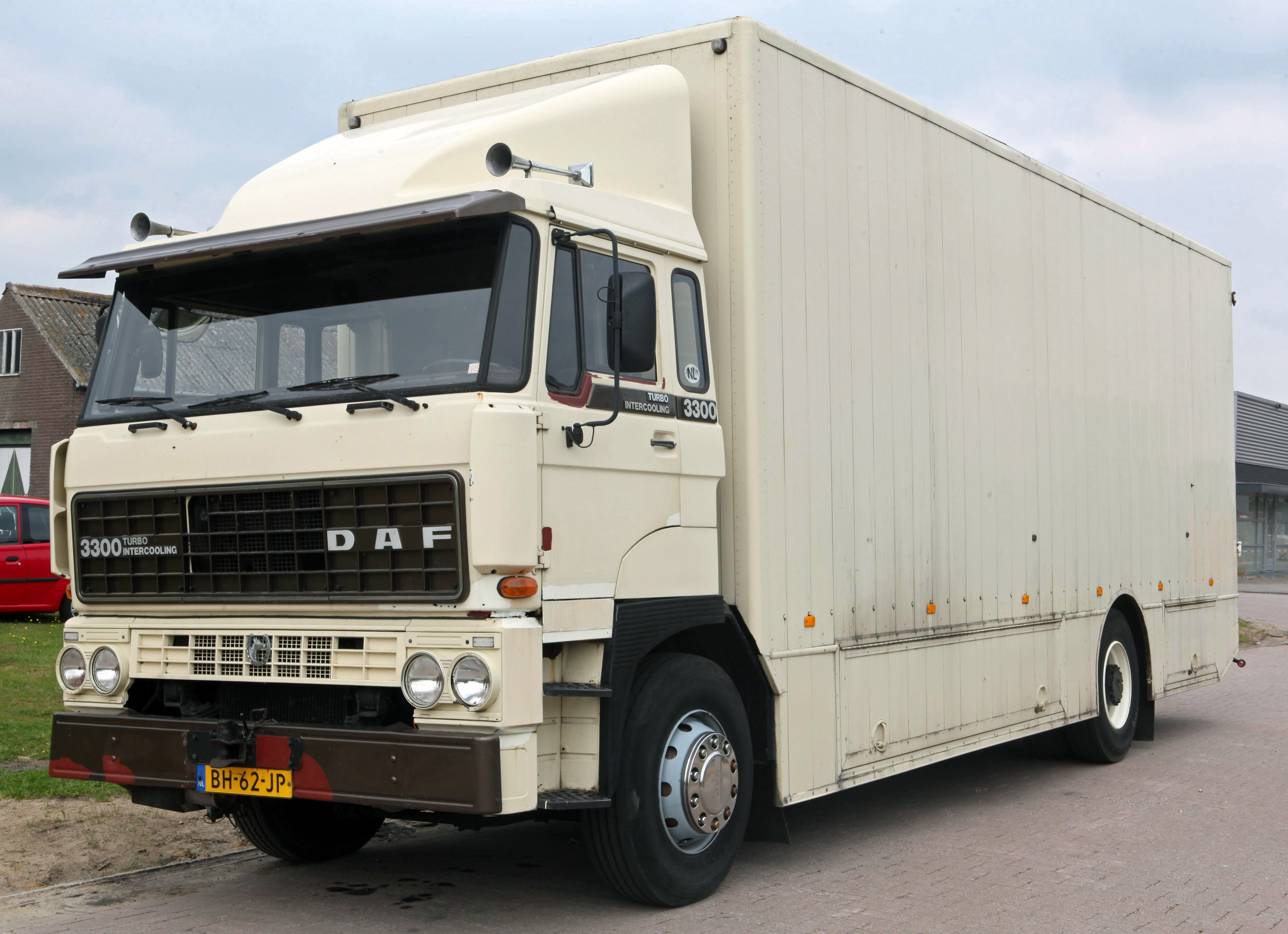
The DAF 3300

Introduced at IAA in September 1973 the '2800' was DAF's replacement for the comfortable and certainly not outdated 2600. The DAF 2800 had the first European intercooled turbodiesel under the hood of its new tilt cab. The 11.6 litre DKS engine produced 320 HP and 1260 Nm. Other engine choices were the turbocharged 280 HP DKTD, the DKT with 260 HP, and the naturally aspirated 250 HP DKA. While based on the modular design of the 1970 F218 cab, the front of F241 cab was redesigned and the new wider cab required the use of a set of three wipers, a distinguishing characteristic of the range. Gearboxes with 12 or 16 speed were offered from ZF, or 13 speed and twin splitter from Fuller. Cabs and engines were also delivered to Ginaf, the Dutch manufacturer of all wheel drive trucks.

In 1975 the more comfortable yet "Superliner" model was added to the lineup in Britain; these luxurious trucks were aimed at users plying the route to the Middle East. They were converted by a caravan builder in England's West Country. To meet Sweden's safety standards since 1975 every F241 and F218 cab got high tension steel adjustment. To meet regulation in Italy that put a lower limit for the number of horsepower per GCWR at 44 ton, output of the exceptional 2800 DKSI was in 1977 boosted to 353 HP and 1410 Nm. This special version 2800 was only sold in Italy and was continued to be supplied until the Ati engines came.

=== Early Eighties ===
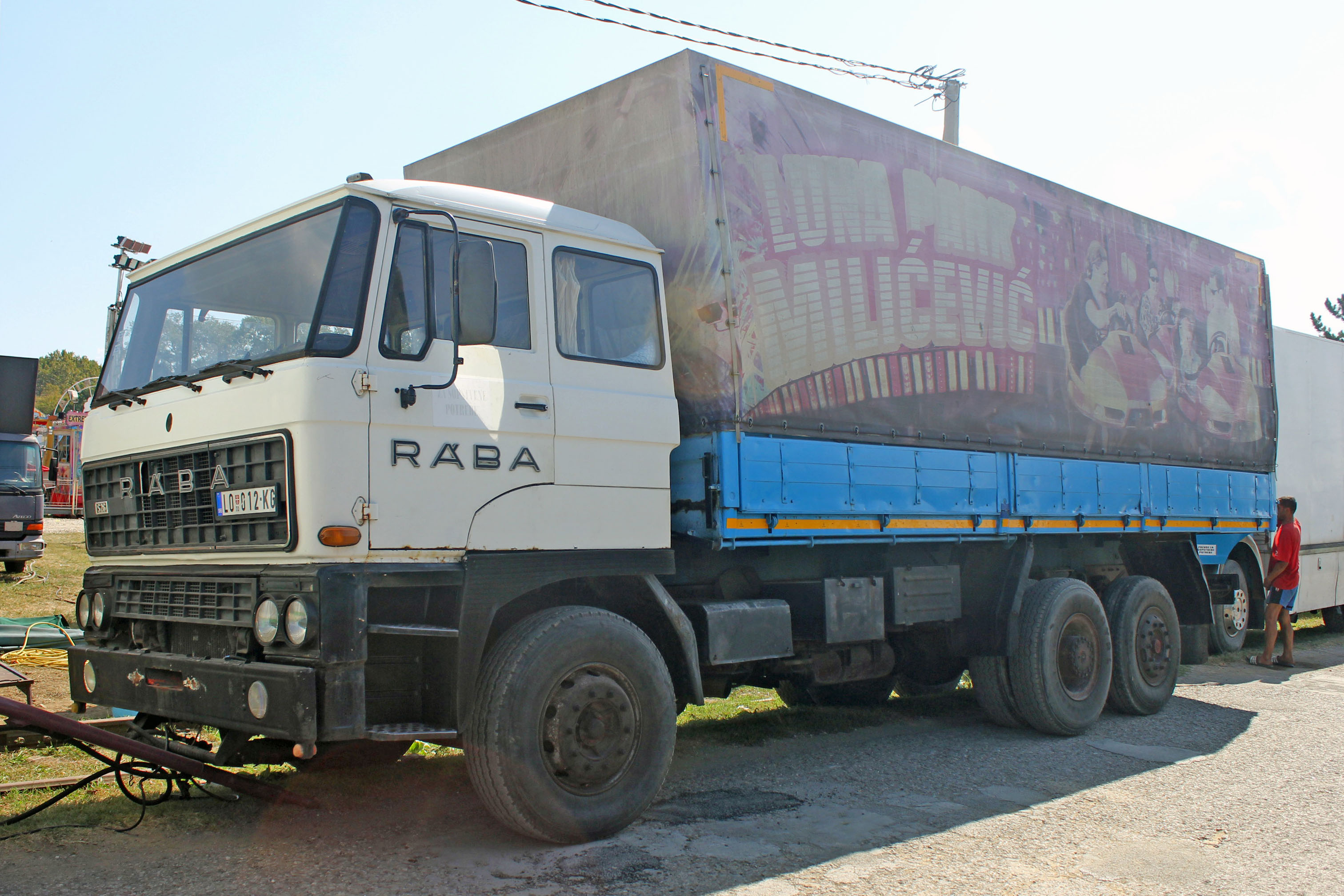
RÁBA truck with DAF cabin

The lineup was further modernized in 1979 when the cabs got a more luxurious interior and with a slight grille rearrangement whereby the "2800" lettering was moved into the upper grille and with an option for the extra efficient 2800 DKSE engine. In spring 1980 RÁBA began using the cab for most of their trucks. In autumn 1980 bonnetted N2800 6x4 NAT (drawbar) or NTT (tractor) was introduced, with new heavy tandem bogie, mainly for export to Africa and Middle-East. In February 1982 at RAI the 3300 model was introduced, with a more quiet and clean DKX 1160 engine, with 330 PS (243 kW), added with more sound insulation in the modified cab. Although it sold well across Europe, DAF kept looking for new niches in the market to sell more units. Examples were the 1982 Top Sleeper, a short cab with a sleeper above it, for high volume transport. This was followed in September 1984 by the famous 3300 Space Cab.

=== ATi ===
In September 1985 DAF introduced the DAF 3600 ATi with "Advanced Turbo intercooling". DAF had taken several efficiency measures to lower internal friction, and combined with a modified driveline including a new hypoid drive axle, higher power and greater fuel efficiency were attained. Fuel consumption decreased from an already low 34L/100km to an astonishing 30L/100km. And that helped boost sales of the range until it was superseded. EU market share increased in 1986 by a full percent, from 6.8% to 7.8%. The most powerful iteration of the new ATi engines was the 1160 DKZ with 274 kW (373 PS)

== Revival ==
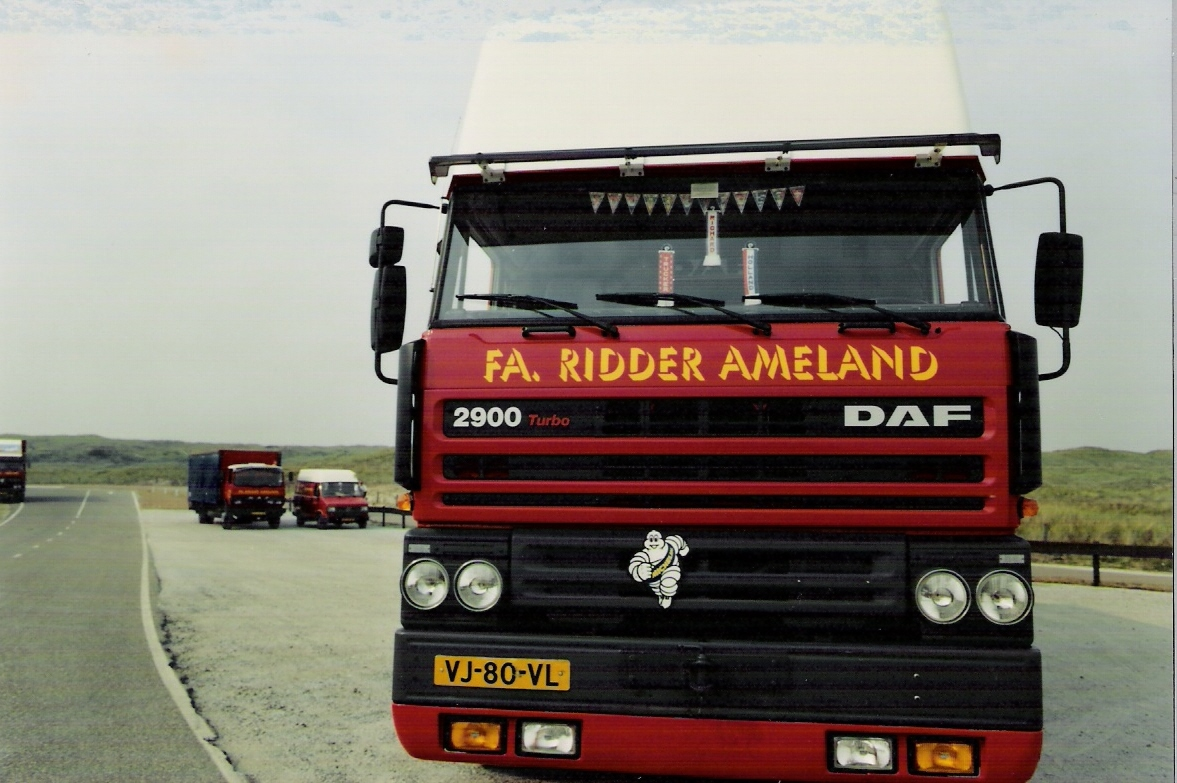
DAF 2900 Turbo

In 1987 the all-new DAF 95 arrived, meaning the F241 series was replaced and discontinued in Europe. However, DAF recognized a gap between the medium-duty 2500/2700 range and the new 95-series, and accordingly revived the F241 in 1990. The new front design cabs which mimicked of the new 95 did not last long, and the F241 cab was taken out of production again in 1995 after only a few hundred had been built. The new 2900 and 3200 models were spartanly equipped models mainly targeting African, Asian, and South American customers. As indicated by the names, 290 or 320 PS (213 or 235 kW) were on offer. In the early ninetees DAF Trucks Australia had not received yet the 95 series (as there were no CKD kits available), and continued assembling the 3600. Those late F241's got installed the newest WS294 and WS315 ATi engines (401-430 HP) from the 95 series (which were in fact sort of 3900 series).

== Bibliography ==
- Peck, Colin (July 2010), DAF Trucks Since 1949, Veloce Publishing, ISBN 9781845842604
