= 200th Street =

200th Street may refer to the following stations of the New York City Subway:

- Bedford Park Boulevard – Lehman College (IRT Jerome Avenue Line), in the Bronx; formerly known as Bedford Park Boulevard – 200th Street; serving the 4 train
- Dyckman Street (IND Eighth Avenue Line), in Manhattan; also known as Dyckman Street – 200th Street; serving the A train
- 200th Street (IRT Third Avenue Line), in the Bronx; the now demolished station on the Third Avenue elevated
