= 300th Armored Cavalry Regiment =

- Active: 1948–1950
- Country: United States
- Branch: United States Army
- Type: Cavalry
- Role: Reconnaissance
- Garrison/HQ: Dallas

The 300th Armored Cavalry Regiment (300th ACR) was a Texas-based reconnaissance unit of the United States Army Organized Reserve Corps, which briefly existed after World War II. It was constituted in 1948 and partially organized from existing units before being inactivated in 1950 and disbanded in 1952.

== History ==
The 300th Armored Cavalry was constituted on 26 November 1948 in the Organized Reserve Corps, and partially organized from existing units. Its headquarters and headquarters company (HHC) was redesignated on 17 December from the headquarters and headquarters troop of the 300th Cavalry Group, Mechanized, which had been constituted on 12 June 1944 as the 143rd Cavalry Reconnaissance Troop, Mechanized, and activated at Framingham, Massachusetts. It was inactivated on 10 September 1945 at Fort Jackson and redesignated Headquarters and Headquarters Troop, 300th Cavalry Group, Mechanized, on 14 February 1947. The unit was activated on 25 February of that year at Dallas. In June 1947, the group was commanded by local ice cream manufacturer Colonel C.R. Smith.

The regiment's 1st Battalion was redesignated from the 323rd Mechanized Cavalry Squadron on 14 February 1949, which had been first constituted on 3 December 1941 as the 818th Tank Destroyer Battalion and activated on 15 December 1941 at Fort Sill after the United States entered World War II. The 818th fought in the Normandy Campaign, the Northern France Campaign, the Rhineland Campaign, the Ardennes-Alsace Campaign, and the Central Europe Campaign during the war. It was equipped with the M10 tank destroyer until conversion to the M36 tank destroyer in February 1945. Postwar, it was inactivated on Camp Shanks, on 30 October 1945. It was redesignated as the 323rd Mechanized Cavalry Squadron in the Organized Reserve on 26 February 1947 and activated on 14 March of that year at Dallas.

The regiment was inactivated on 22 November 1950. The 1st Battalion became the 818th Tank Battalion on 10 March 1952, when the regiment was disbanded. The 300th ACR was not authorized a coat of arms or distinctive unit insignia.
