= 2300 series =

2300 series may refer to:

== Japanese train types ==
- Hankyu 2300 series (1960) EMU, operated by Hankyu Corporation from 1960 to 2015
- Hankyu 2300 series (2024) EMU, operated by Hankyu Corporation since 21 July 2024
- Meitetsu 2300 series EMU cars included in Meitetsu 1700 series trains (2008–2021) and Meitetsu 2200 series trains (2005–present)
- Nankai 2300 series EMU
- Odakyu 2300 series EMU operated by the Odakyu Electric Railway
- Sanyo Electric Railway 2300 series EMU operated by the Sanyo Electric Railway
