= Kintetsu 5200 series =

Japanese train type

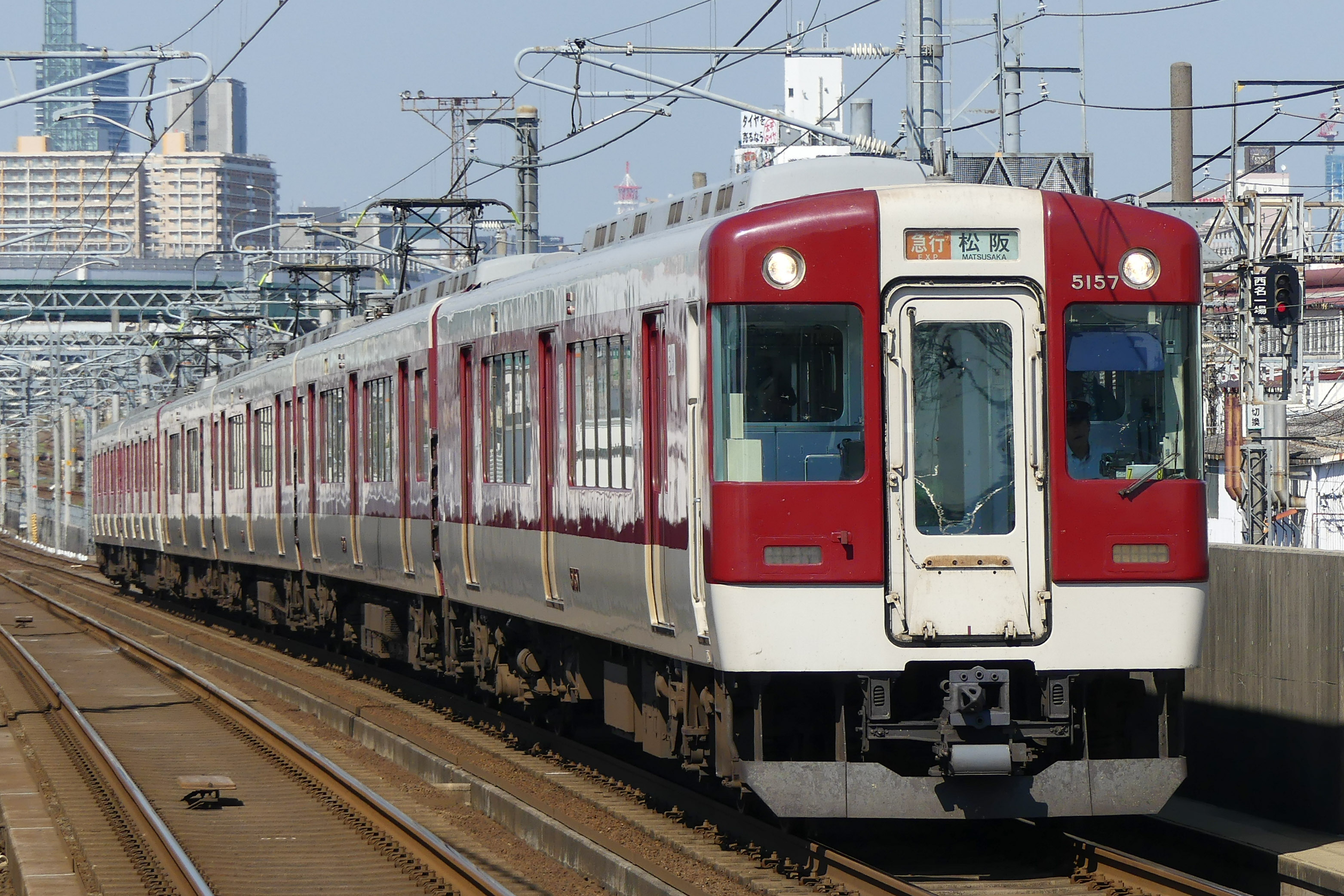
- 5200 series set 5207 bound for Matsusaka
- In service: 1988–present
- Manufacturer: Kinki Sharyo
- Constructed: 1988–1993
- Entered service: 1988
- Refurbished: 2007–2014
- Number built: 52 vehicles (13 sets)
- Number in service: 52 vehicles (13 sets)
- Formation: 4 cars per trainset
- Fleet numbers: VX01–VX13
- Capacity: 132 (intermediate cars); 124 people (end cars)
- Operators: Kintetsu Railway
- Lines served: E Nagoya Line; D Osaka Line

Specifications
- Car body construction: Steel
- Car length: 20,720 mm (68 ft 0 in)
- Width: 2,800 mm (9 ft 2 in)
- Height: 4,150 mm (13 ft 7 in)
- Doors: 3 pairs per side
- Maximum speed: 110 km/h (68 mph)
- Traction system: Variable frequency (GTO)
- Traction motors: MB-5023/5035-A/B
- Power output: 165 kW (221 hp) per motor
- Electric system(s): 1,500 V DC, overhead lines
- Current collector(s): Pantograph
- Track gauge: 1,435 mm (4 ft 8 1/2 in)

The Kintetsu 5200 series (近鉄5200系) is an electric multiple unit (EMU) train type operated by Kintetsu Railway in Japan on limited express services on the Osaka and Nagoya Lines.

== Variants ==
- 5200 series: 4-car sets which are designated as the first batch introduced in 1988.
- 5209 series: 4-car sets with backup auxiliary power source switched to a static inverter introduced in 1991.
- 5211 series: 4-car sets with modified bogies introduced in 1993.

== Overview ==
=== Formations ===
5200 series sets are formed as follows.

Car	1	2	3	4
Designation	Tc	M	M	Tc
Numbering	5100	5200	5250	5150

=== Interior ===
Seating consists of perpendicular seating throughout.

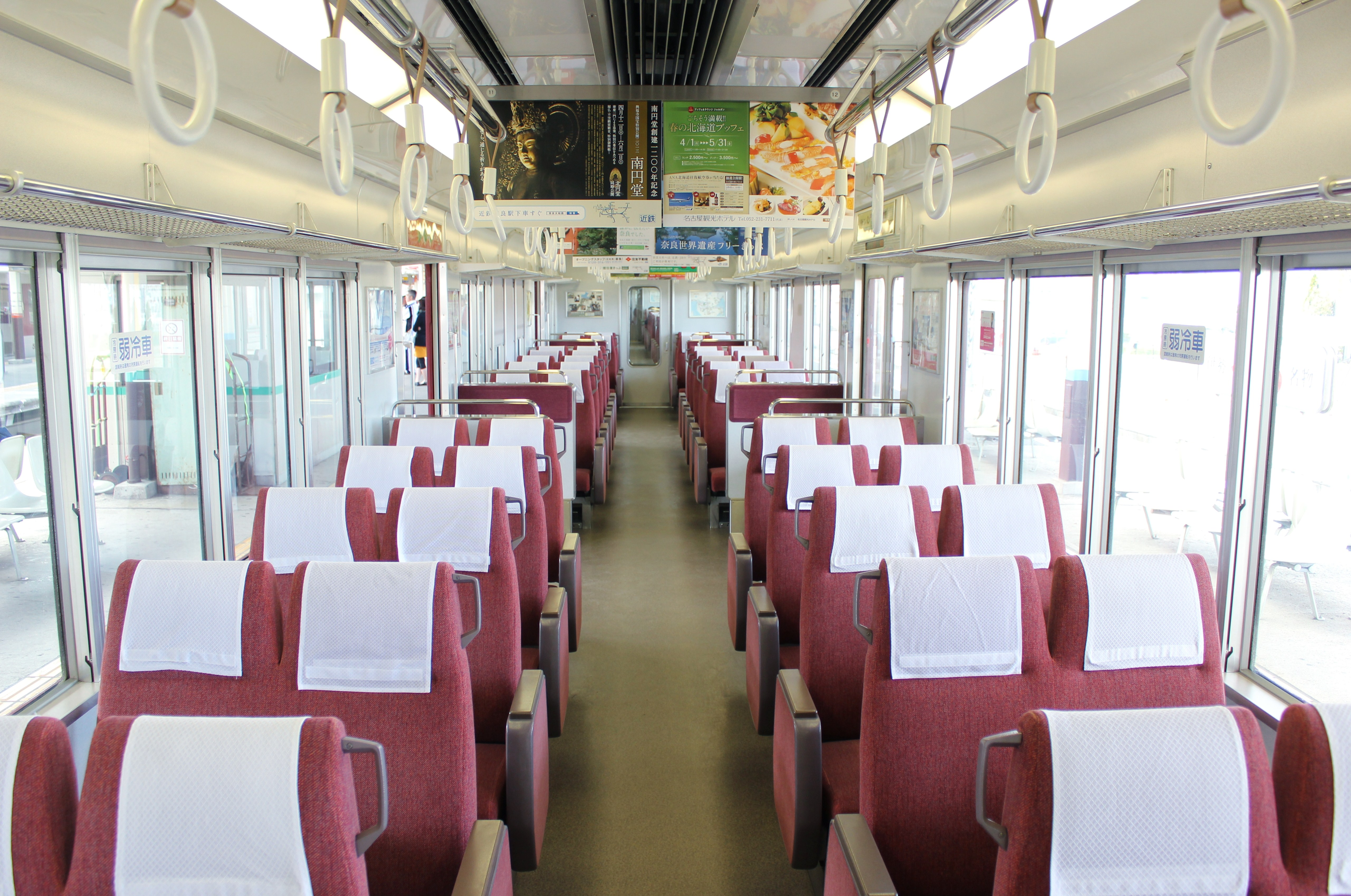
Interior after refurbishment work

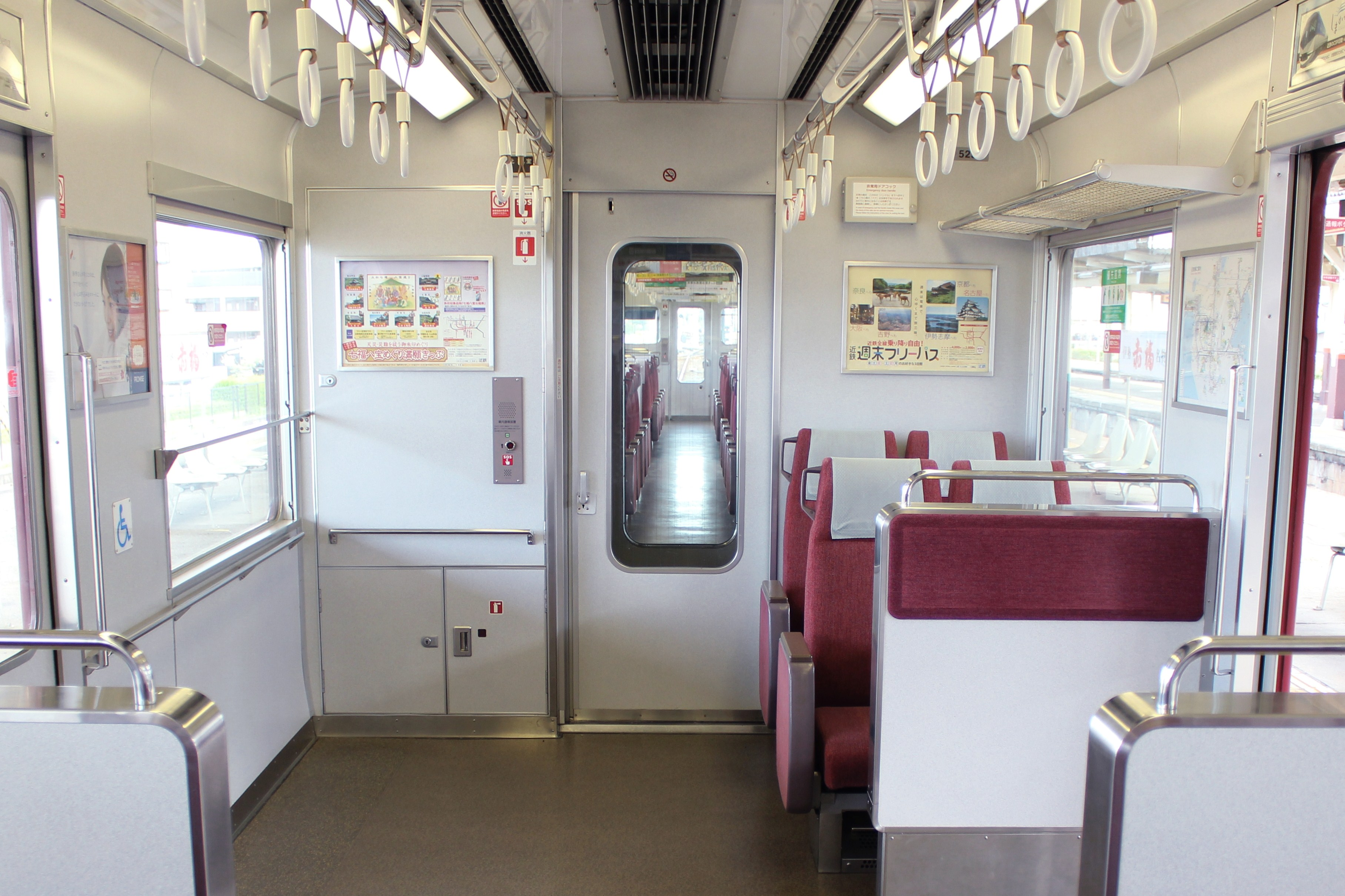
Wheelchair space added after refurbishment

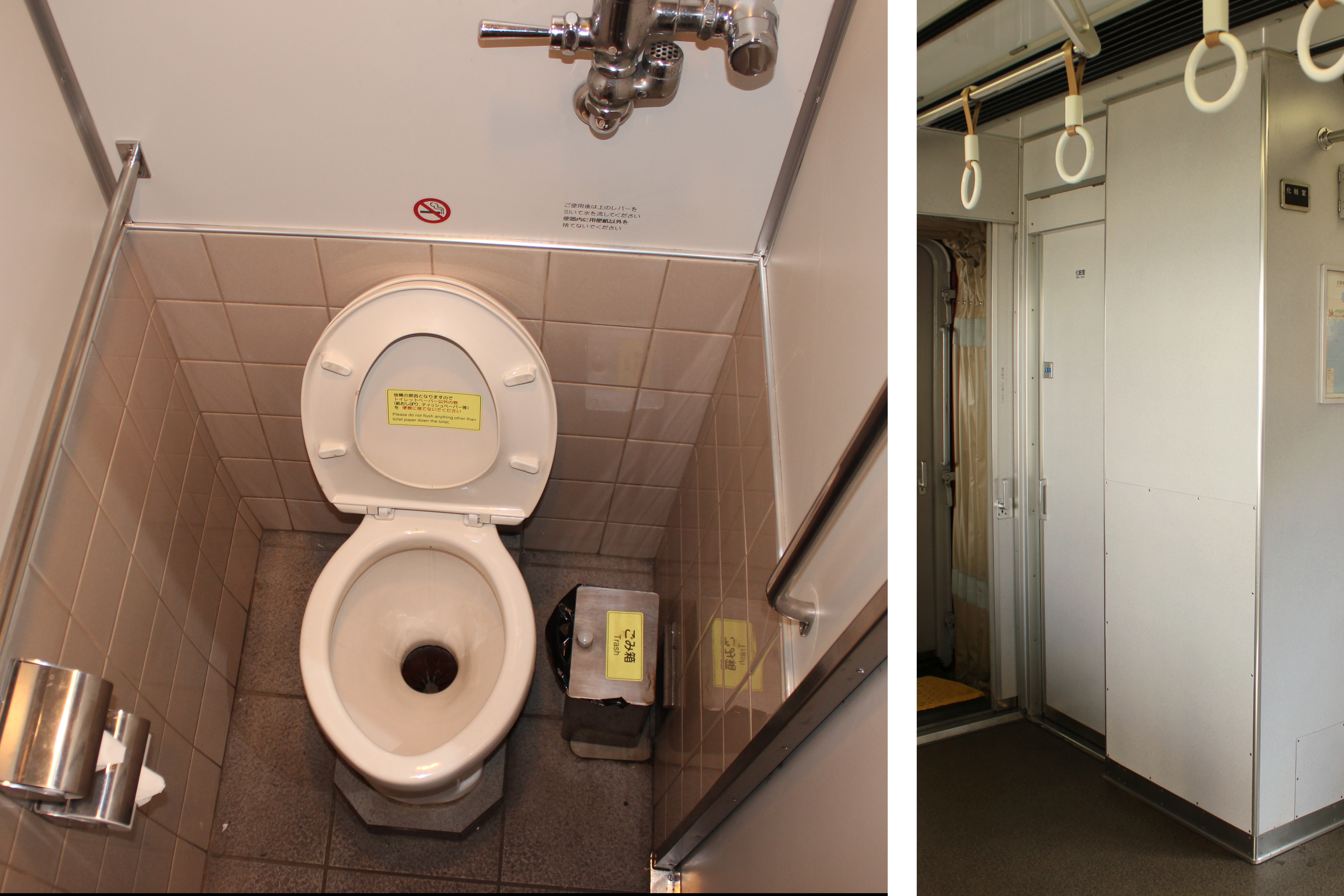
Upgraded onboard washroom facilities

== History ==
The trains were introduced in 1988 to fulfill a need for long-distance services as well as for replacing aging 2600 series trainsets.

The design of the trains revolved around three principles:

- More comfortable
- Multi purpose (Vehicles suitable for morning and evening commuting, daytime long-distance express transportation, and for private charters)
- Modern technology (For ease of maintenance)

In 1988, the series won the Good Design Award by the Japan Institute of Design Promotion.

In September 2014, set 5205 was repainted in a commemorative livery from the 1960s.

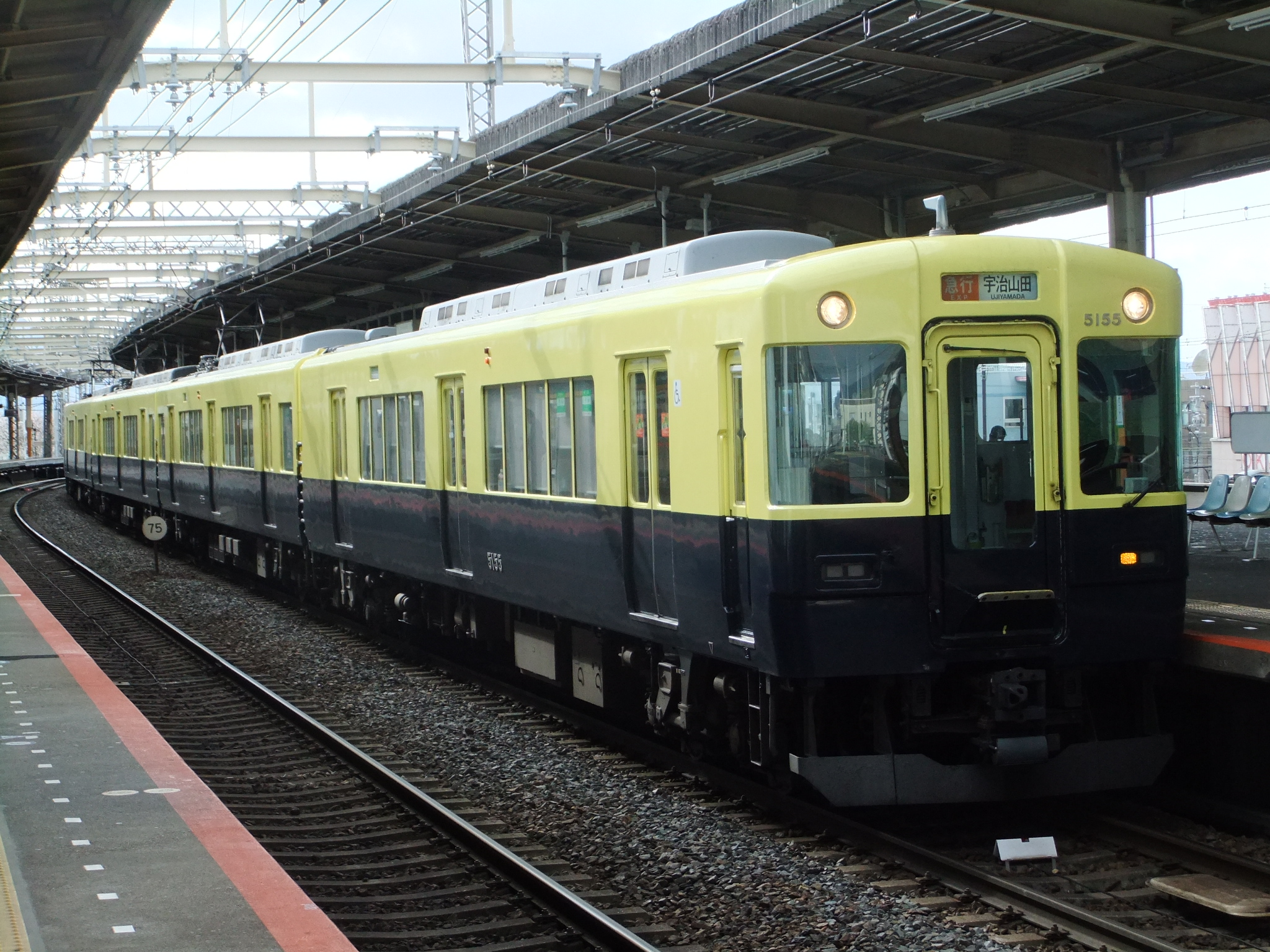
Set 5205 in a commemorative livery
