= Hohem =

Chinese technology company

Shenzhen Hohem Technology Co., Ltd.,
- Trade name: Hohem
- Industry: Technology; consumer electronics; videography; photography
- Founder: Chen Min
- Headquarters: China
- Area served: Worldwide

Shenzhen Hohem Technology Co., Ltd., is a technology company based in Shenzhen, China. It is dedicated to the independent research, development, production, and sales of stabilizers and flight control systems. It was founded by Chen Min in 2014. Hohem's products are designed for smartphones, action cameras, and DSLR cameras.

== History ==
In 2015, Hohem introduced its first three-axis handheld action camera stabilizer.

In 2016, the company unveiled a smartphone stabilizer with automatic face tracking technology at CES.

In 2017, Hohem launched its first foldable smartphone stabilizer and had a crowdfunding campaign on Indiegogo.

In 2020, Hohem released the iSteady X, the company's three-axis smartphone gimbal, which won the 2020 SVIEF Disruptive Innovation Award.

In 2021, Hohem released the iSteady V2, an AI tracking three-axis stabilizer, along with the iSteady X2 and iSteady Q.

In 2023, Hohem launched the iSteady M6 smartphone stabilizer and updated the iSteady XE, iSteady V2s, and iSteady MT2. The iSteady MT2, a 4-in-1 camera stabilizer.

== Reviews ==
While Hohem's technology and products have received positive reviews in many aspects, some reviewers pointed out potential design flaws in the Hohem X2 gimbal.

== Awards ==
- In 2022, the iSteady V2 received the Red Dot Design Award in Germany.
- iF Design Award.
- Good Design Award (Japan)
