= Good Design Award (Museum of Modern Art) =

Industrial design program in New York

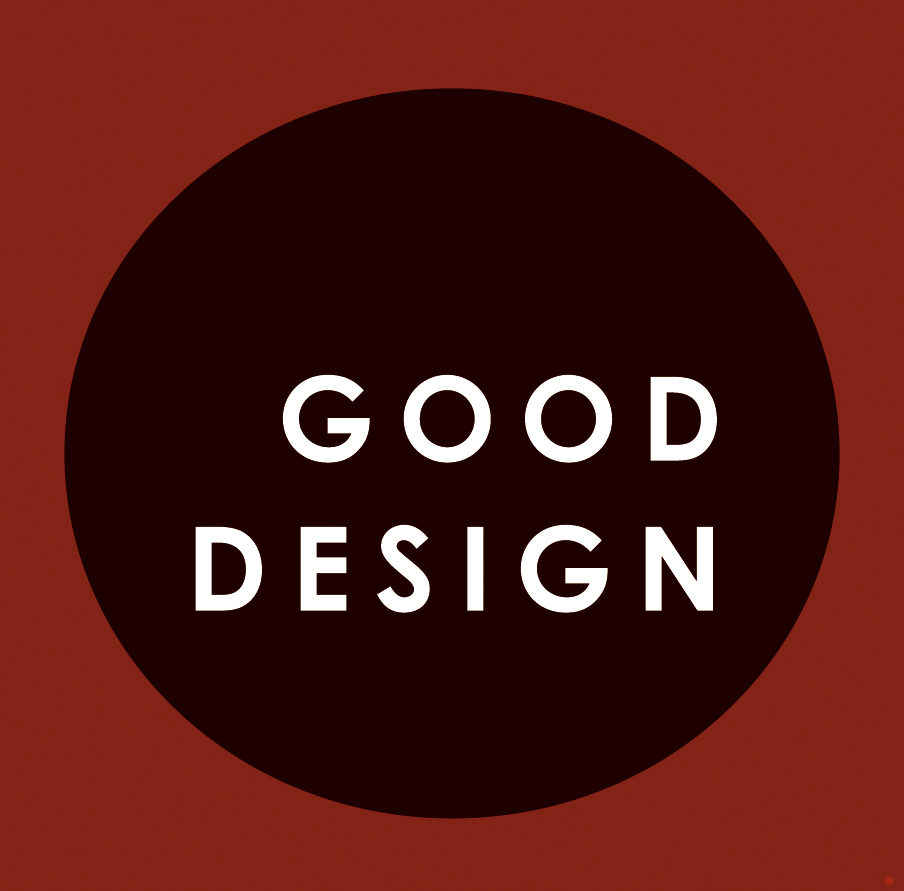
Good Design mark, created by Morton and Millie Goldsholl for MoMA

The Good Design exhibition series was an industrial design program organized by the Museum of Modern Art (MoMA) in New York, in cooperation with the Merchandise Mart in Chicago, held between 1950 and 1955. No awards were granted to designers whose work was put on view in these exhibitions, despite misinformation suggesting otherwise.

== History ==
The exhibition series Good Design was spearheaded by Edgar Kaufmann, Jr., who was then director of the Industrial Design Department of MOMA. Predecessors to this series were two other exhibition series on modernist design, including a series that began with Useful Objects Under $5 (later the maximum price climbed to $10 and eventually $100), the other a series of international design competitions. An agreement to launch the Good Design exhibition series was struck between Rene d'Harnoncourt, director of MoMA, and Wallace O. Ollman, general manager of the Merchandise Mart. Good Design had five editions:

- 1st Good Design exhibition, held from 21 November 1950 to 28 January 1951
- 2nd Good Design exhibition, held from 27 November 1951 to 27 January 1952
- 3rd Good Design exhibition, held from 23 September to 30 November 1952
- 4th Good Design exhibition, held from 22 September to 29 November 1953
- 5th Good Design exhibition, held from 8 February to 20 March 1955

The Museum of Modern Art developed a circular Good Design tag, designed by Morton and Millie Goldsholl of Chicago, which manufacturers of products chosen for exhibition could use in advertising and sales. Critic Michael Kimmelman of the New York Times called this tag a "version of the Good Housekeeping Seal of Approval", and compared it to efforts of similar institutions like V&A in the UK or Bauhaus in Germany in promoting modernist design.

MoMA has staged retrospective exhibitions called What Was Good Design (2011) and The Value of Good Design (2019).

The Japan Institute of Design Promotion also sponsors an annual Good Design Award which is unrelated to the American award.

== Notable people ==
- Joel Robinson (c. 1923-?), graphic designer, exhibited at MoMA's 1951 Good Design show
- Florence Knoll, Good Design Award 1950, 1953

== See also ==
- Good Design Movement
- Chicago Athenaeum
