= HTC Infobar A02 =

Android mobile phone

INFOBAR A02
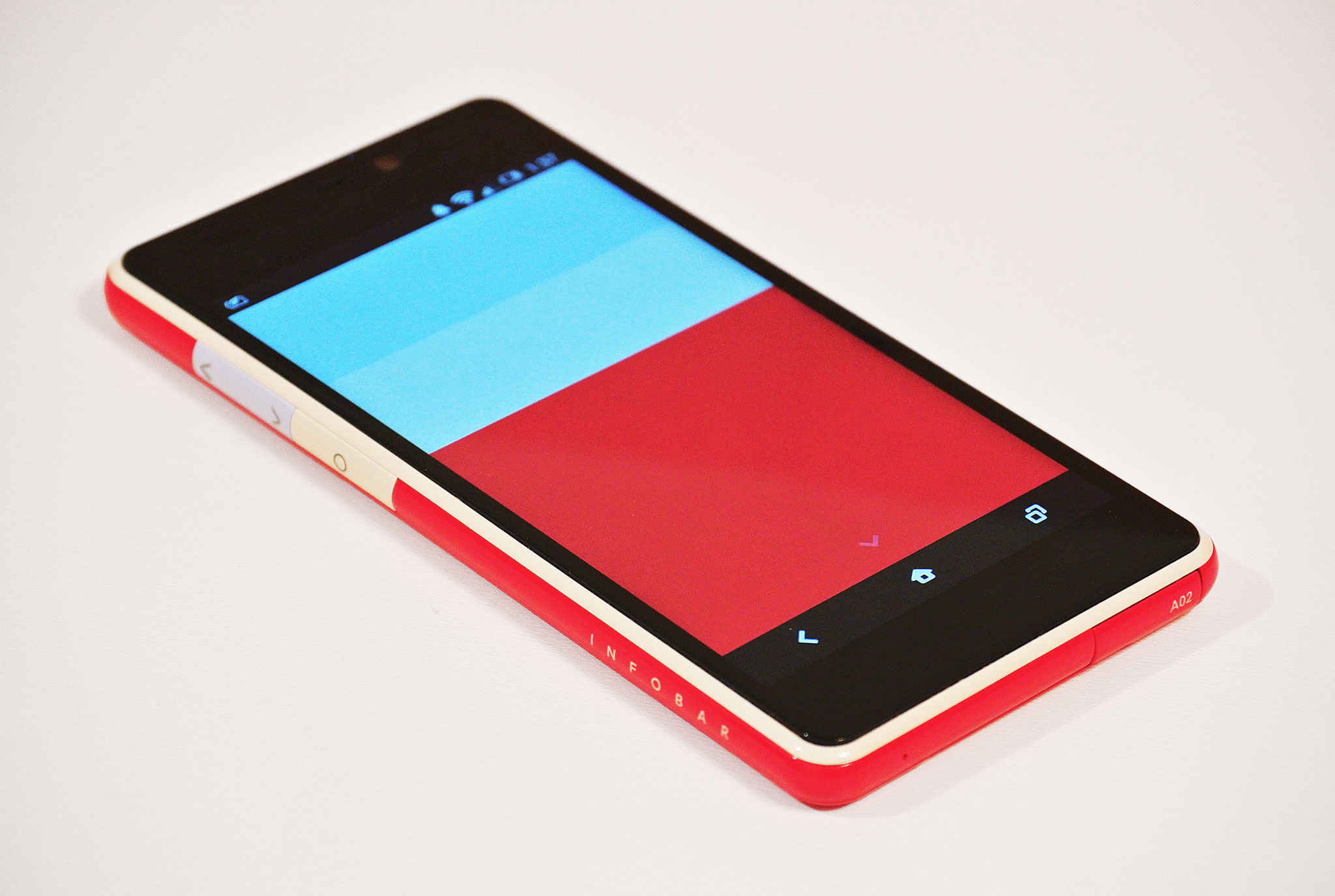
- INFOBAR A02 (HTX21) in NISHIKIGOI
- Brand: au
- Manufacturer: HTC
- Type: Smartphone
- Series: iida / au design project
- Family: INFOBAR
- First released: February 15, 2013; 13 years ago
- Discontinued: July 2013
- Predecessor: INFOBAR A01
- Successor: INFOBAR A03
- Compatible networks: 3G: CDMA2000 1xMC (CDMA 1X) (800 MHz/2 GHz), W-CDMA (850 MHz/2 GHz; unavailable in Japan); 2G: GSM (850/900/1800/1900 MHz; unavailable in Japan); 3.9G LTE: FDD-LTE (au 4G LTE) (800 MHz/1.5 GHz); 3.5G: CDMA2000 1xEV-DO MC-Rev.A (CDMA 1X WIN/WIN HIGH SPEED), CDMA2000 1xEV-DO Rev.A/Rel.0, UMTS (W-CDMA; unavailable in Japan)
- Form factor: Slate
- Colors: NISHIKIGOI (Red); ICE GRAY (White); AOAO (Blue)
- Dimensions: 138 mm (5.4 in) H 70 mm (2.8 in) W 9.7 mm (0.38 in) D
- Weight: 147 g (5.2 oz)
- Operating system: Android 4.1 with iida UI 2.0
- System-on-chip: Qualcomm Snapdragon S4 Pro APQ8064
- CPU: 1.5 GHz quad-core
- Memory: 1 GB RAM
- Storage: 16 GB ROM
- Removable storage: microSD (up to 2 GB), microSDHC (up to 32 GB)
- Battery: 2,100 mAh (removable)
- Charging: Approx. 150 minutes
- Rear camera: 8.0 MP CMOS, autofocus, f/2.0
- Front camera: 2.1 MP CMOS
- Display: 4.7 in (120 mm) CG-Silicon TFT LCD; 1280×720 pixels (HD), 16.77 million colors
- Water resistance: IPX5/IPX7 (water resistant), IP5X (dust resistant)
- Model: HTX21
- Made in: Taiwan

The INFOBAR A02 by iida (model number HTX21) is a touchscreen Android smartphone manufactured by HTC (imported by HTC Japan) for the au network, operated by KDDI and Okinawa Cellular Telephone. It supports 3G/3.5G (au 3G; former CDMA 1X / CDMA 1X WIN) and 3.9G (au 4G LTE) networks. The device was selected for the "Good Design Best 100" and received a Good Design Award in 2013.

== History ==
- 25 January 2013 – Officially announced by KDDI.
- 15 February 2013 – Released early in the Kanto and Okinawa regions in NISHIKIGOI and ICE GRAY color options.
- 23 February 2013 – Released in NISHIKIGOI in the Kansai, Chubu, and Hokuriku regions.
- 28 February 2013 – Released in NISHIKIGOI in all remaining regions across Japan.
- 2 March 2013 – Released in ICE GRAY in the Hokkaido, Hokuriku, Kansai, and Kyushu regions.
- 8 March 2013 – Released in ICE GRAY in all remaining regions across Japan.
- 15 March 2013 – Released in AOAO nationwide.
- 26 April 2013 – Desktop charging cradle released nationwide.
- Early July 2013 – Sales discontinued in all regions except Kyushu.
- 1 October 2013 – Awarded the 2013 Good Design Award and selected for the "Good Design Best 100".

== Specifications ==
=== Hardware ===
The INFOBAR A02 features an aluminum frame with rounded side edges designed to fit comfortably in the hand. The top-right section of the frame functions as an antenna for 1seg TV reception, while the bottom-left section acts as the primary cellular communication antenna. The back cover incorporates a notch designed for easy battery removal, which also serves as a finger-grip when opening the external connector cover and doubles as a speaker grille. It includes a strap hole and a removable 2,100 mAh battery.

The device is powered by a quad-core 1.5 GHz Qualcomm Snapdragon S4 Pro (APQ8064) processor paired with a Qualcomm MDM9615 baseband modem. It features a 4.7-inch CG-Silicon TFT LCD display with HD resolution (1280×720 pixels), 1 GB of RAM, and 16 GB of internal storage expandable via microSDHC cards up to 32 GB. The rear camera features an 8.0-megapixel CMOS sensor with autofocus and an f/2.0 aperture lens, complemented by a 2.1-megapixel front-facing CMOS camera. Additional hardware features include IPX5/IPX7 water resistance, IP5X dust resistance, FeliCa (Osaifu-Keitai), infrared communication, 1seg TV tuner, FM radio, Bluetooth 4.0, Wi-Fi tethering for up to eight devices, and MHL output over microUSB.

=== Software ===
The smartphone runs on Android 4.1 paired with iida UI 2.0 designed by Yugo Nakamura, replacing HTC's standard HTC Sense interface. Sound design—including UI sound effects and default ringtones—was created by musician Keigo Oyamada (Cornelius). Pre-installed software includes KDDI E-mail, au Widgets, Skype, Friends Note, Polaris Office, Google Talk, Uta Pass, Video Pass, and PlayStation Mobile support.

== Known issues ==
On 11 April 2013, KDDI released software update version 1.20.971.1 to resolve an issue where the device repeatedly rebooted on the home screen.

On 18 December 2013, software update version 1.25.971.1 was released to address multiple system bugs, including text being input into unintended positions when typing in the browser, the virtual keyboard failing to appear during text input on certain websites, and NFC/Osaifu-Keitai locks failing to release via 3LM Security remote locking.
