= Hankyu 9300 series =

Japanese train type

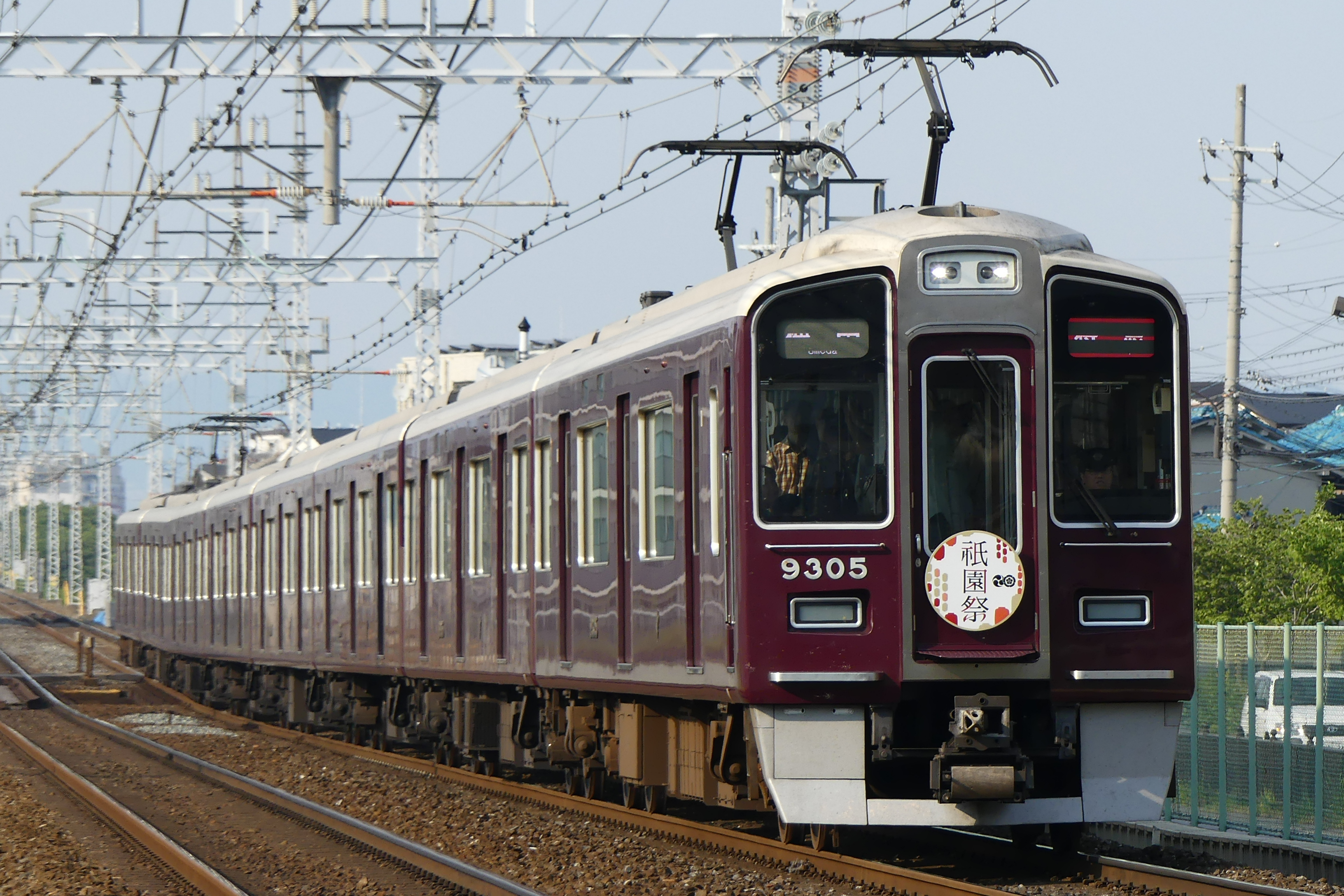
- A 9300 series third build train on a limited express service, July 2018
- In service: 2003–present
- Manufacturer: Hitachi
- Family name: Hitachi A-train
- Replaced: 2300 series, (Note: 1st generation that was introduced in 1960) 6300 series
- Constructed: 2003–2010
- Refurbished: 2025–
- Number under construction: 6 vehicles (reserved-seat PRiVACE car)
- Number built: 88 vehicles (11 sets)
- Number in service: 88 vehicles (11 sets)
- Formation: 8 cars per trainset
- Operator: Hankyu Railway
- Depot: Shojaku
- Line served: Hankyu Kyoto Main Line

Specifications
- Car body construction: Aluminium alloy, double-skin
- Car length: 18,900 mm (62 ft 0 in)
- Width: 2,800 mm (9 ft 2 in)
- Height: 4,095 mm (13 ft 5.2 in)
- Doors: 3 pairs per side
- Maximum speed: 115 km/h (70 mph)
- Traction system: Variable frequency (IGBT)
- Electric system: 1,500 V DC overhead catenary
- Current collection: Pantograph
- Bogies: FS-565 (motored); FS-065 (trailer)
- Braking system: Electronically controlled pneumatic brakes with regenerative braking
- Safety systems: ATS, ATC
- Coupling system: Shibata-Type
- Multiple working: 7300 series
- Track gauge: 1,435 mm (4 ft 8 1/2 in)

The Hankyu 9300 series (阪急電鉄9300系) is an electric multiple unit (EMU) train type operated in Japan by the private railway operator Hankyu Railway since 2003.

== Operations ==
The 8-car 9300 series trains operate on the Hankyu Kyoto Main Line, primarily on limited express services.

== Formations ==
As of 1 April 2012, the fleet consisted of eleven eight-car sets formed as follows, with three motored (M) cars and five non-powered trailer (T) cars.

Car No.	1	2	3	4	5	6	7	8
Designation	Mc1	T1	T2	T2	T2	T1	M1	Mc2
Numbering	9300	9850	9870	9880	9890	9860	9800	9400

The "Mc1" and "M1" cars are fitted with two single-arm pantographs.

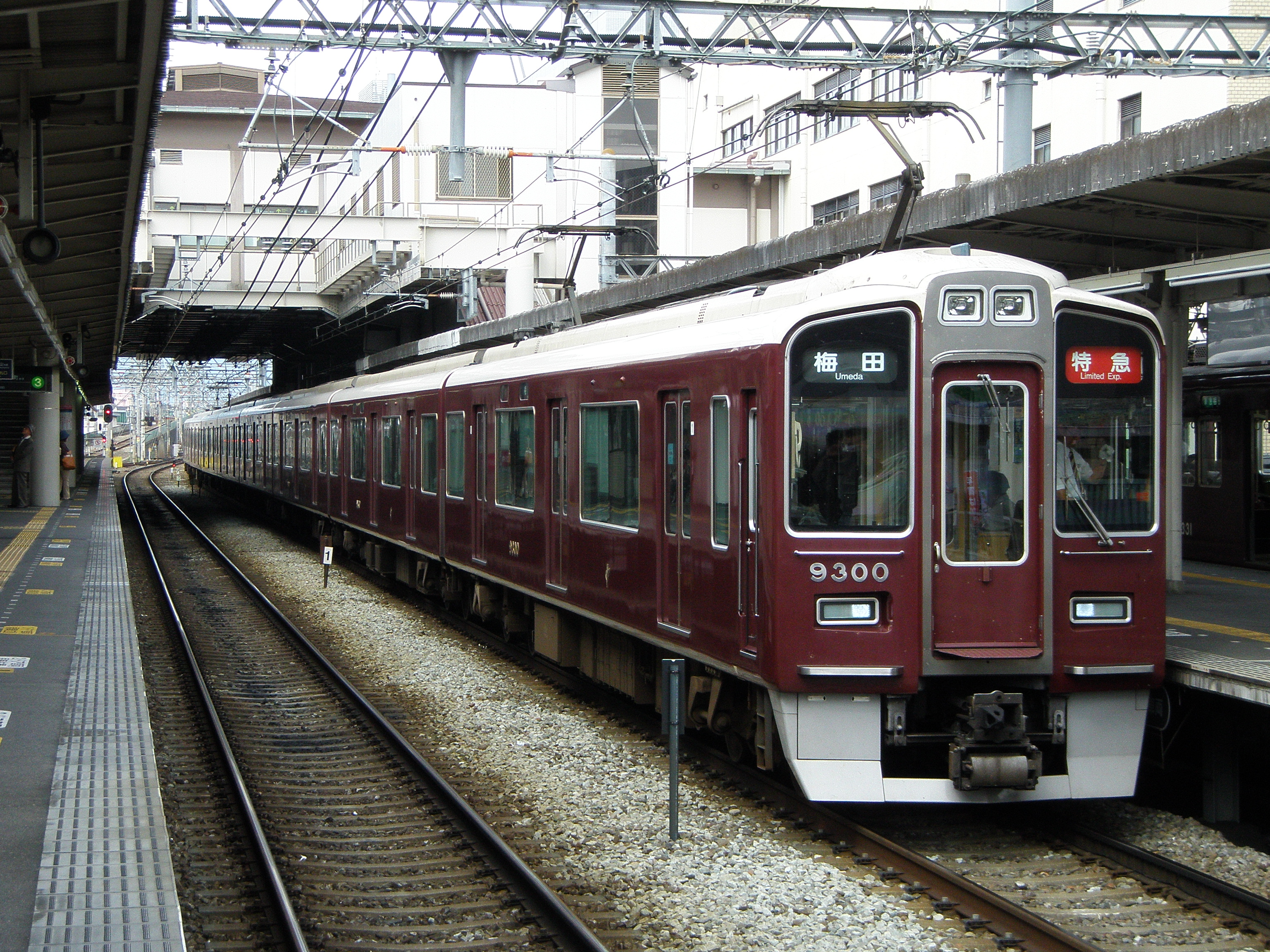
9300 series first build train, October 2008

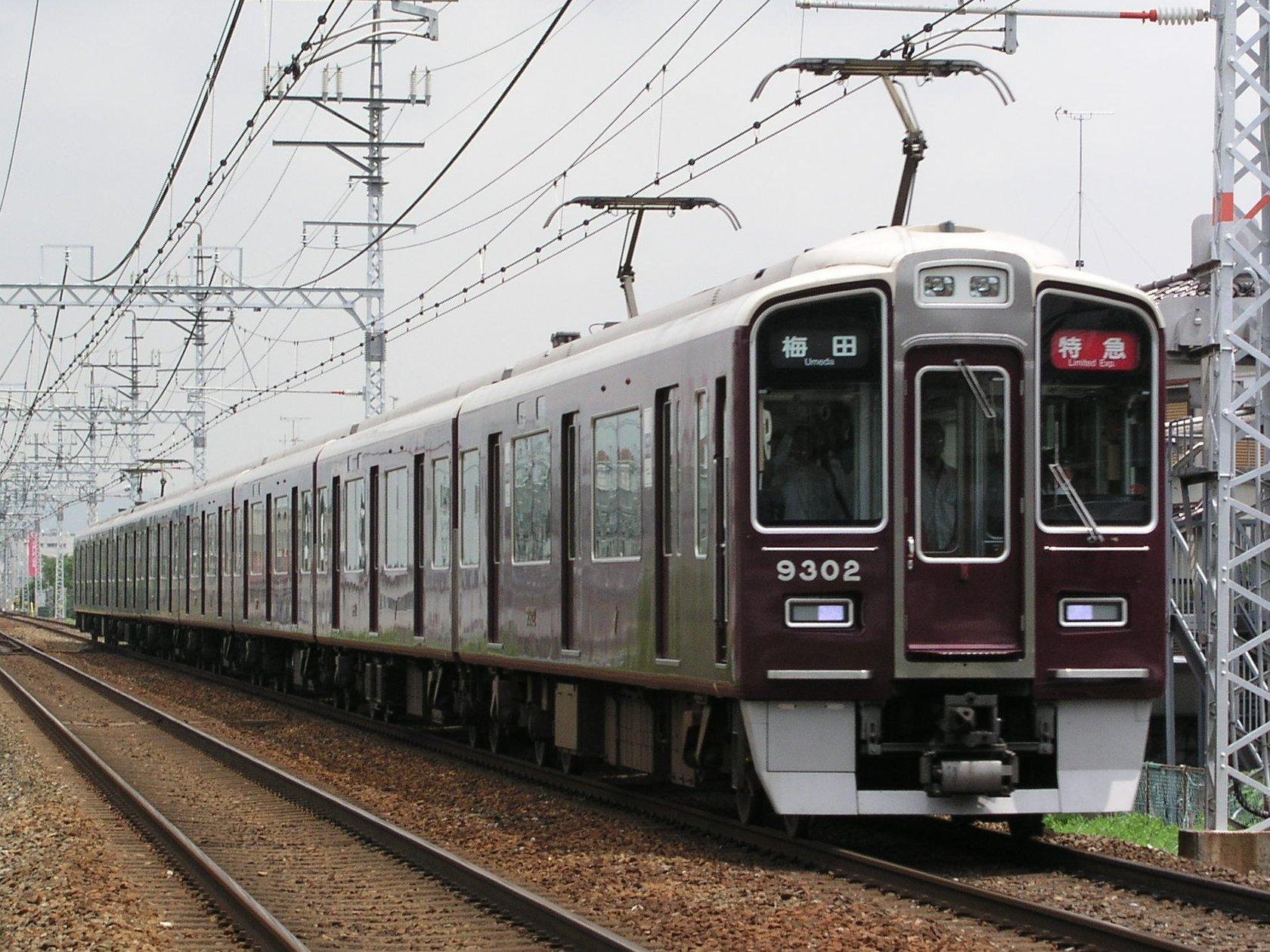
9300 series second build train, July 2006

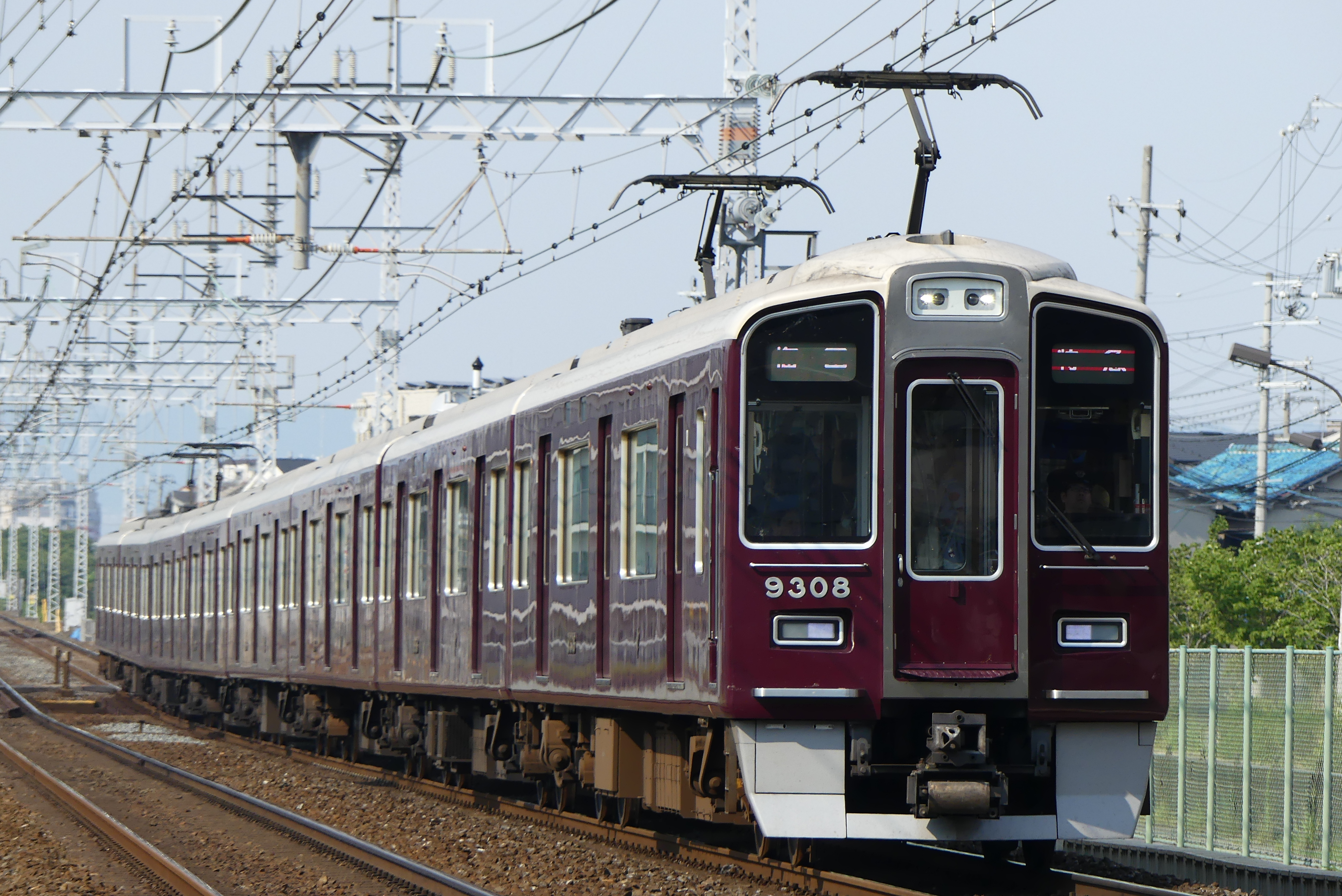
9300 series third build train, July 2018

== Interior ==
Passenger accommodation consists of transverse seating, with longitudinal bench seating at the car ends.

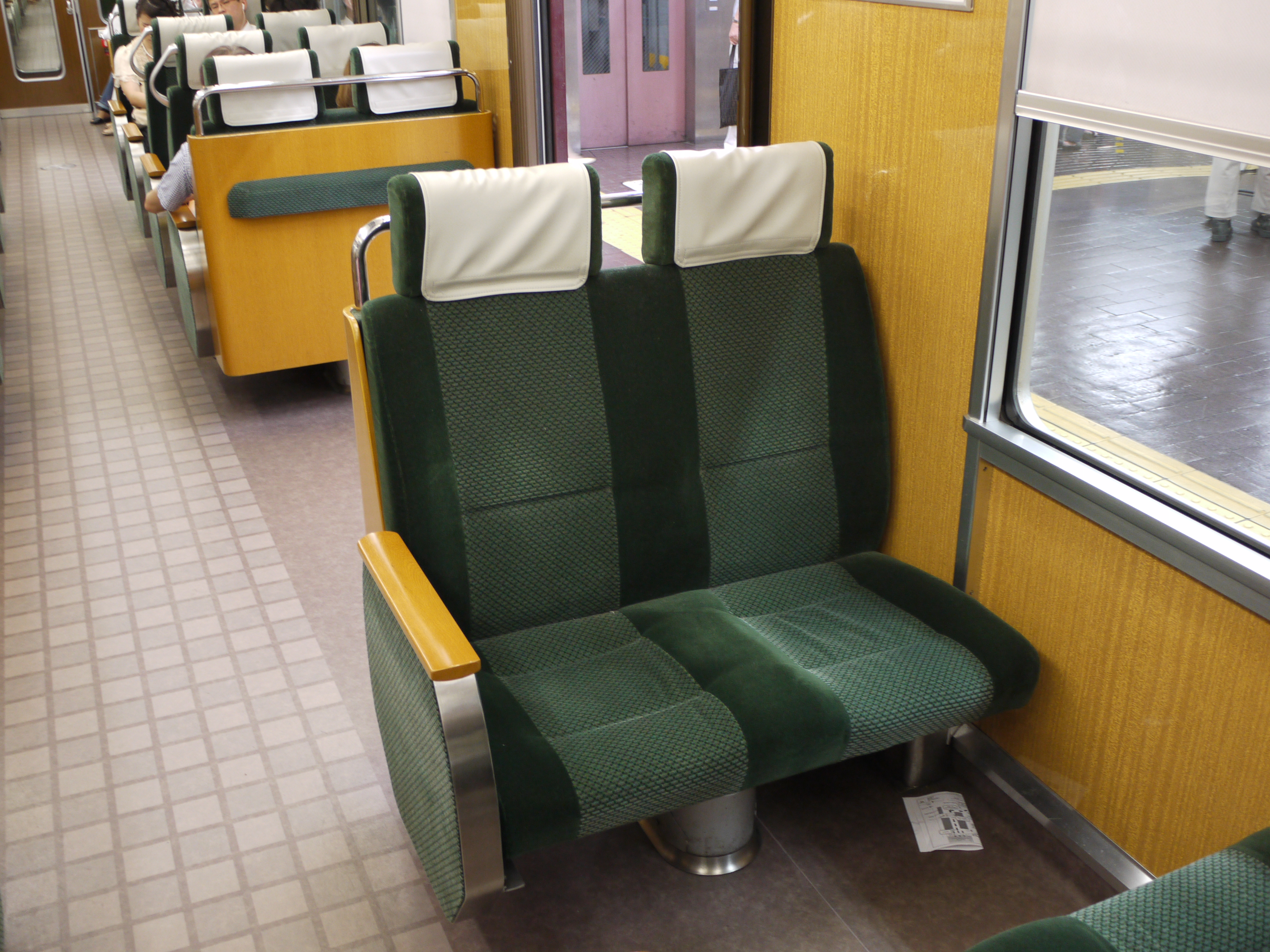
Transverse seating in a 9300 series train

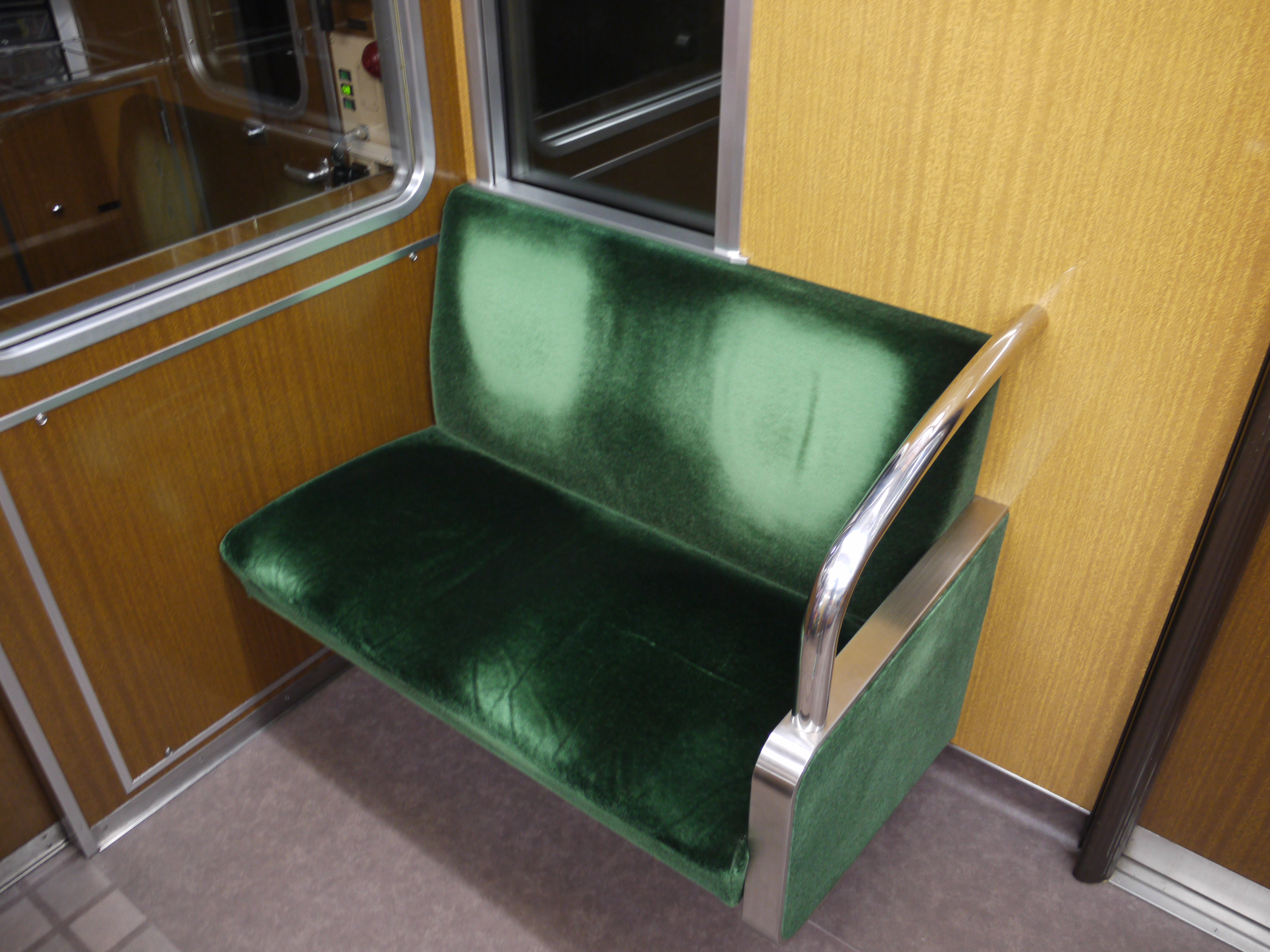
Longitudinal seats

== Future plans ==
On 21 November 2023, Hankyu Corporation announced that a new seat reservation service, branded PRiVACE, is due to be introduced in July 2024 on Kyoto Main Line Limited Express services. A total of 6 sets of the 9300 series is scheduled to temporarily incorporate one reserved seat car each as the fourth car from the Osaka end and operate alongside one newly-built 2300 series (Note: 2nd generation that is scheduled to be introduced in 2024) set initially. As delivery of further 2300 series sets progresses in the future, the PRiVACE cars will gradually be transferred to the 2300 series fleet.

== Refurbishment ==
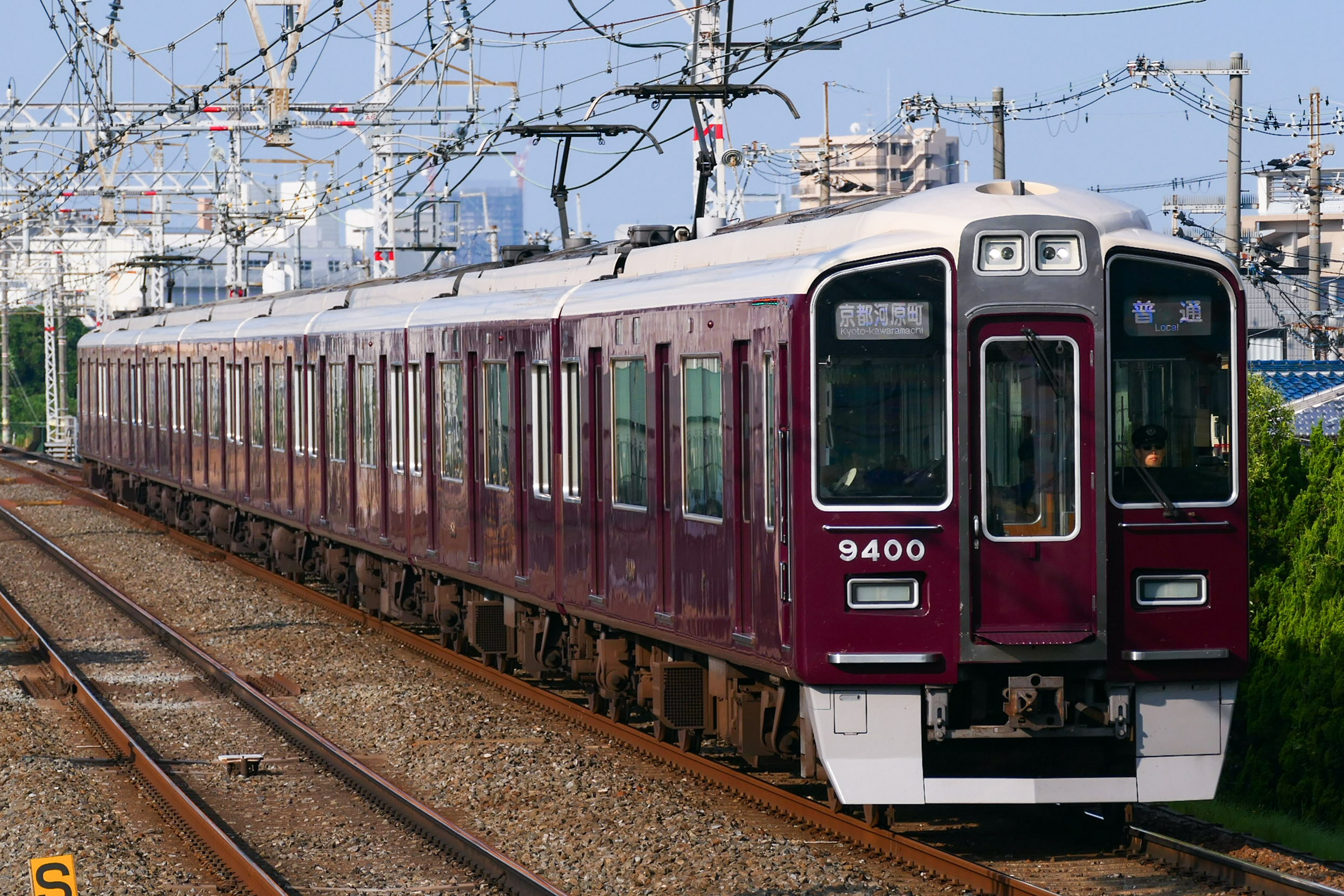
Refurbished set 9300 in July 2026

Refurbishment includes updated control equipment, replacement of transverse seating with longitudinal seating, an additional motored car, and external LED destination displays. Additionally, cars 2 and 3 swapped positions, with the new car 2 being renumbered 9900 (from 9870). The first refurbished set, set 9300, underwent testing from 26 May 2025.
