= Joel Robinson (graphic designer) =

American graphic designer

- Born: 1915
- Died: 2012 (aged 96–97)
- Education: New York University, Cooper Union
- Occupations: Designer, furniture maker, illustrator

Adolph Joel Robinson (1915–2012) was an American artist and designer. He was the first African American designer to be recognized by the Museum of Modern Art in its Good Design exhibition series and the first to have his work acquired for MoMA's permanent collection.

== Career ==
After attending an unidentified high school in New York City, Robinson spent several years studying architecture at New York University and Cooper Union. However, he encountered racial prejudice in the architectural field and sought work in the advertising field instead. He worked for a number of New York advertising agencies prior to 1952, including Hartwell Ayles and William Douglas McAdams. In February 1954, Robinson was promoted from creative director to executive vice president at David D. Polon Advertising Agency.

In his spare time, Robinson designed fabric and other objects. He partnered with manufacturer L. Anton Maix to sell fabric screen printed with his Ovals design. This fabric was exhibited at MoMA's 1951 Good Design show, making Robinson the first African American to have work included in that exhibition series. A second version of this textile pattern, Ovals #1, appeared in the 1952 and 1955 Good Design shows. Robinson's career was featured in the May 1952 issue of Ebony magazine.

== Personal life ==
In October 1952, Ebony magazine again featured the young designer Joel Robinson in an article entitled "Wealthy Bachelors." He met his wife, Mrs. Dolores Robinson, as a direct result of this magazine feature.

== Collections ==
- Cooper Hewitt, Smithsonian Design Museum
- Minneapolis Institute of Art
- Museum of Modern Art
- Cleveland Museum of Art
- Victoria and Albert Museum
