= Hankyu 2000 series (2025) =

Japanese electric multiple unit train type

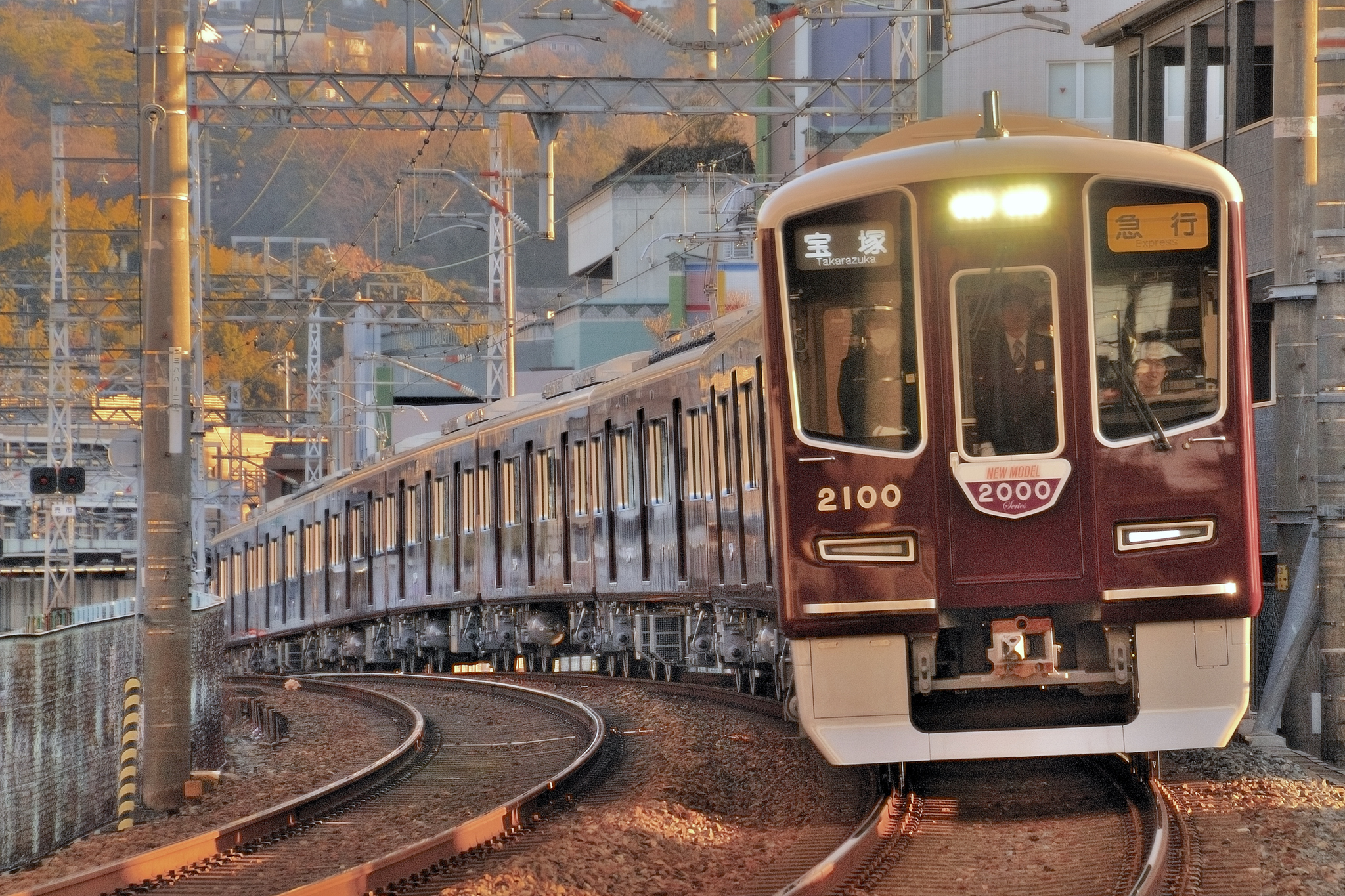
- Set 2000 in February 2025
- In service: 24 February 2025 – present
- Manufacturer: Hitachi
- Number under construction: 40 vehicles (5 sets)
- Number built: 16 vehicles (2 sets)
- Number in service: 16 vehicles (2 sets)
- Formation: 8 cars per trainset
- Operator: Hankyu Railway
- Lines served: Kōbe Main Line; Takarazuka Main Line

Specifications
- Car body construction: Aluminium, double-skin
- Car length: 19,000 mm (62 ft 4 in)
- Width: 2,770 mm (9 ft 1 in)
- Height: 4,095 mm (13 ft 5 in)
- Traction system: Variable frequency (SiC-MOSFET)

The Hankyu 2000 series (阪急2000系) is an electric multiple unit (EMU) train type operated by the private railway operator Hankyu in Japan since 2025.

== Overview ==
Details of the 2000 series, alongside the 2300 series, were first announced by Hankyu Railway on 6 October 2023. The 2000 series was developed for use on commuter services on the Kobe and Takarazuka main lines.

Initially deployed on Takarazuka Line services, the first set, 2000, entered revenue service on 24 February 2025. A second set, 2001, was introduced on Kobe Line services on 6 December of that year.

In May 2026, Hankyu announced plans to procure five additional sets as part of its 2026 business plan.

== Design ==
The 2000 series trains use double-skinned aluminium body construction and are manufactured by Hitachi. They incorporate several styling cues synonymous with Hankyu, including maroon and ivory body colouring, wood grain veneers, and "golden olive"-coloured seats.

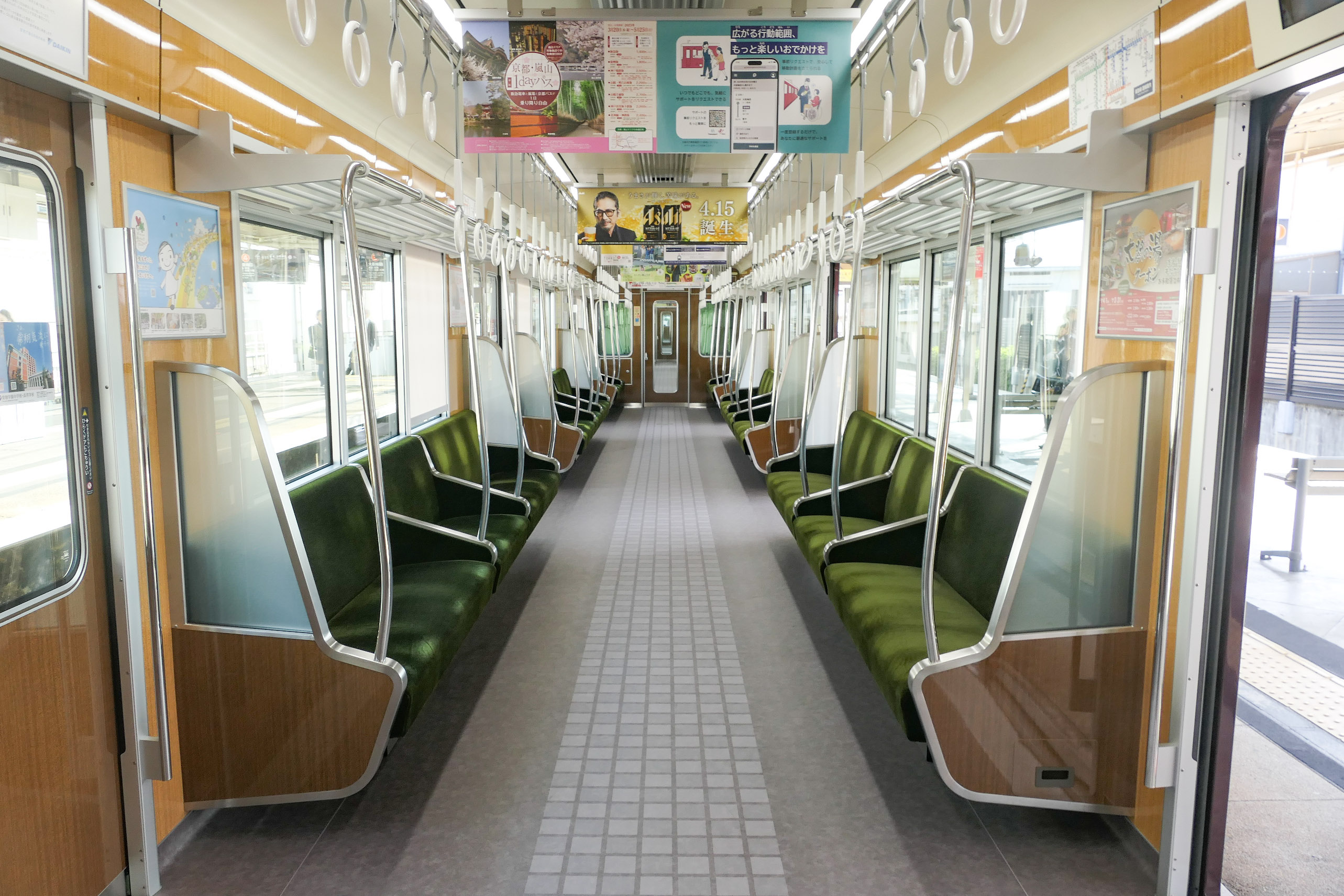
Interior

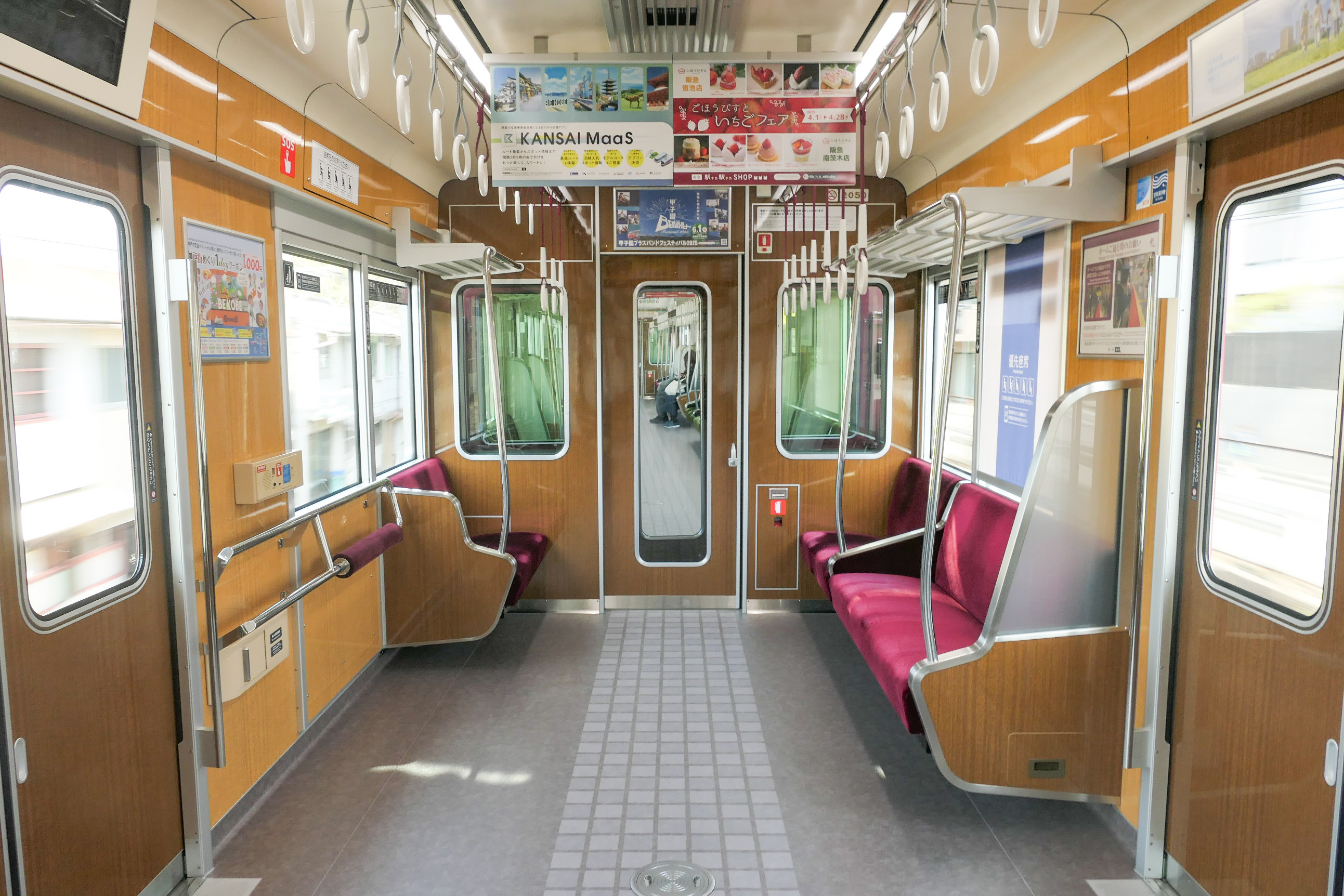
Priority seating with wheelchair space at left

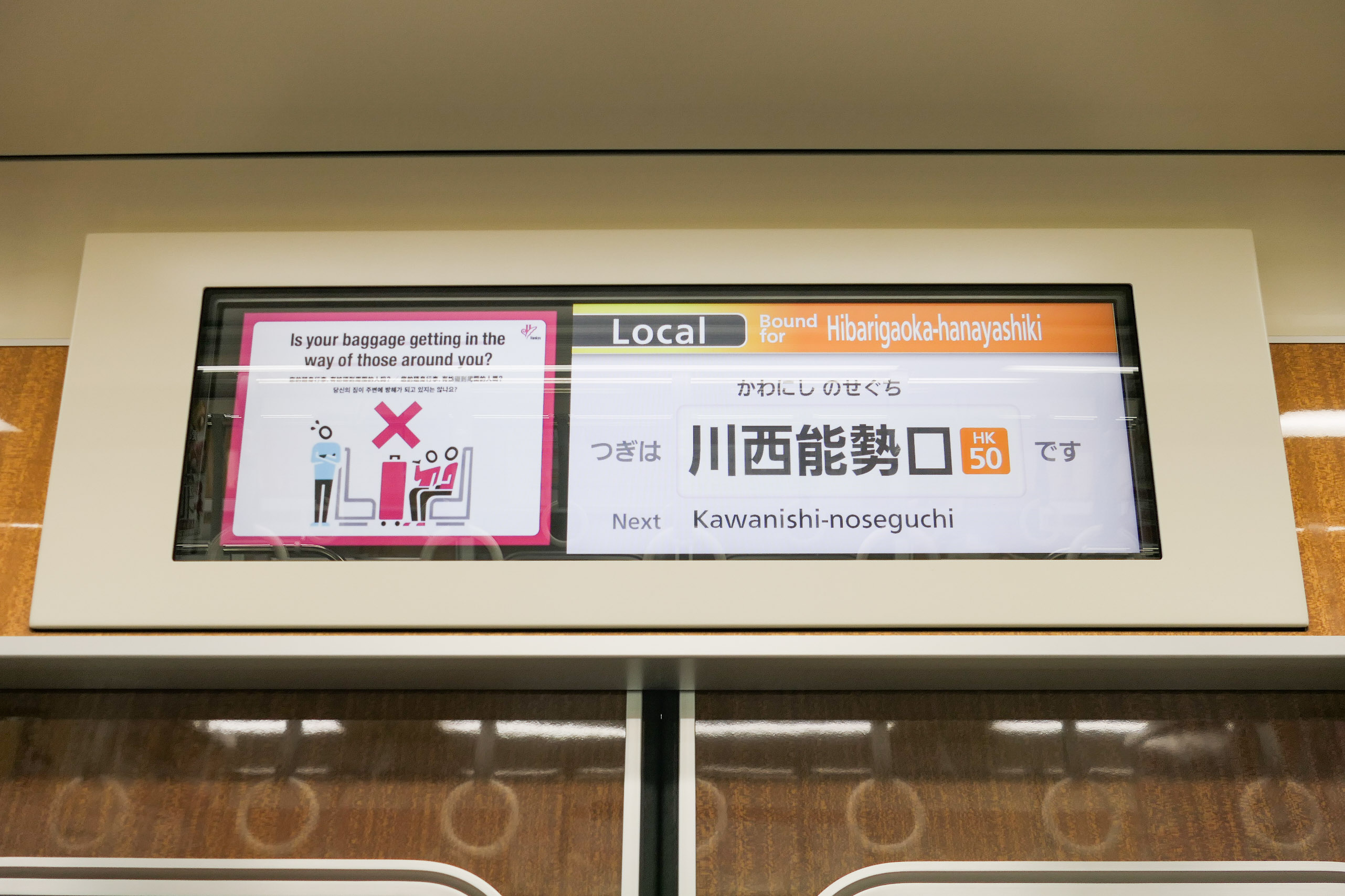
LCD information display

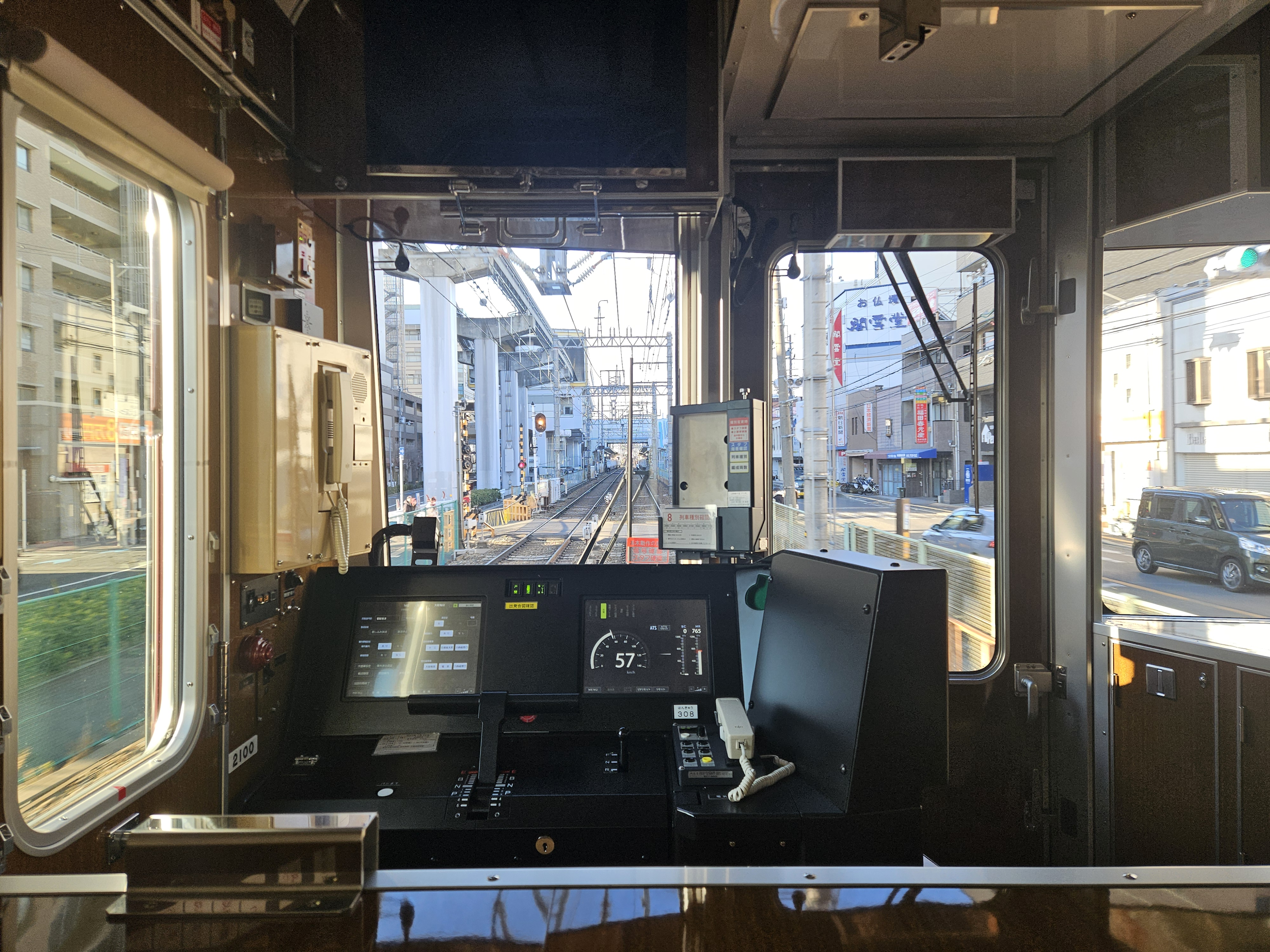
Driver's cab

== Formation ==
The 2000 series sets consist of four motored (M) cars and four trailer (T) cars. They are formed as shown below.

| | ← Osaka-umeda Kobe-Sannomiya, Takarazuka → | | | | | | | |
| Designation | 2000 (Tc) | 2500 (M) | 2600 (M') | 2050 (T) | 2150 (T) | 2550 (M) | 2650 (M') | 2100 (Tc) |

The "M" cars are each equipped with two single-arm pantographs.
