= Hankyu 2300 series (2024) =

Japanese electric multiple unit train type

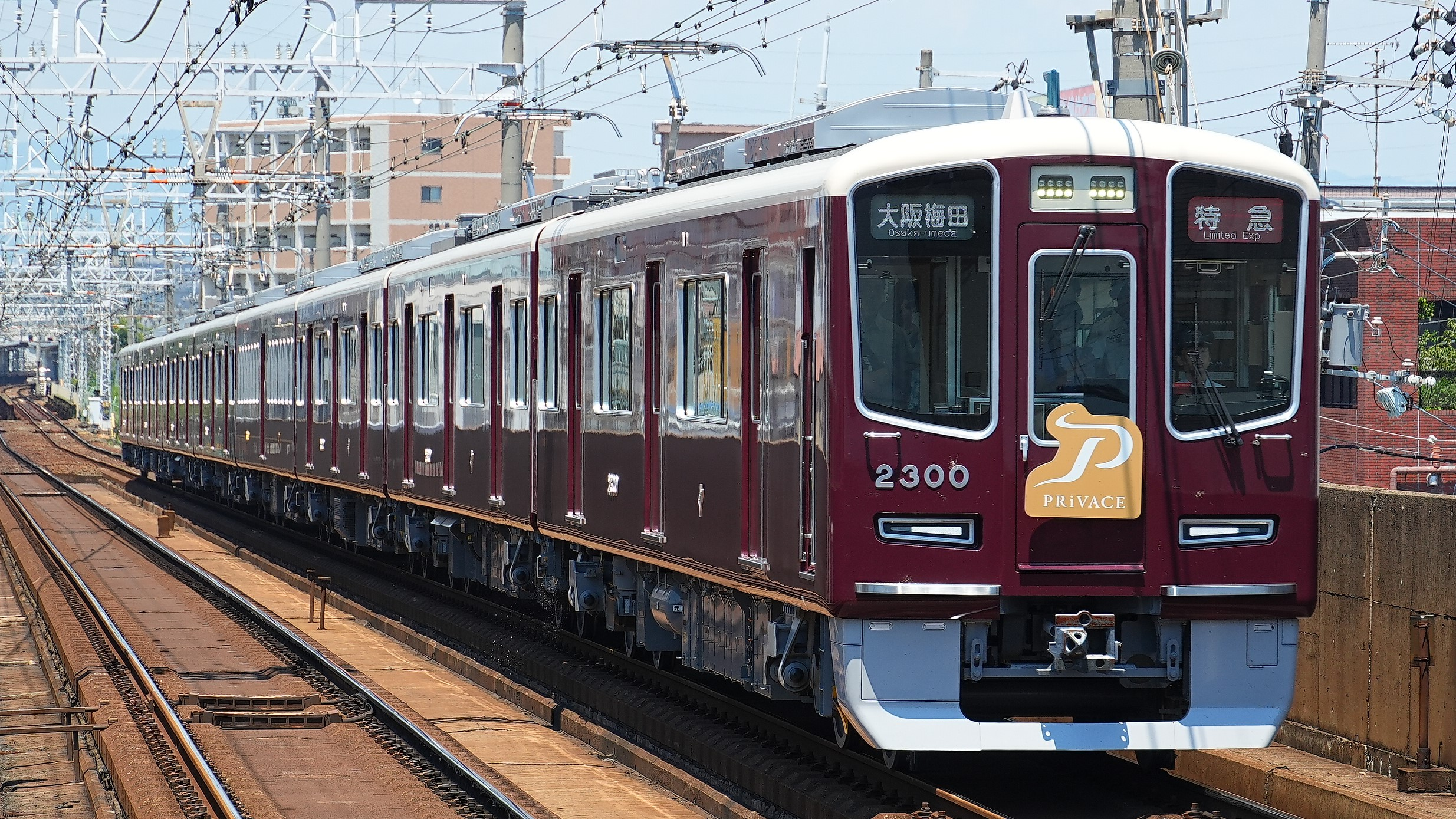
- Set 2300 in July 2024
- In service: 21 July 2024 – present
- Manufacturer: Hitachi
- Number under construction: 72 vehicles (9 sets)
- Number built: 24 vehicles (3 sets) as of 1 April 2025
- Formation: 8 cars per trainset
- Fleet numbers: 2300–
- Operators: Hankyu Railway
- Lines served: Kyoto Main Line

Specifications
- Car body construction: Aluminium, double-skin
- Car length: 18,900 mm (62 ft 0 in)
- Width: 2,830 mm (9 ft 3 in)
- Height: 4,095 mm (13 ft 5 in)
- Doors: 3 per side; 1 per side (PRiVACE)
- Traction system: Variable frequency (SiC-IGBT hybrid module)
- Power output: 190 kW (250 hp) per motor
- Bogies: FS579M (motored); FS579T (trailer)

The Hankyu 2300 series (阪急2300系) is an electric multiple unit (EMU) train type operated by the private railway operator Hankyu in Japan since 2024.

== Overview ==
The 2300 series was developed for use on limited express services on the Kyoto Main Line. The fourth car from the Osaka end, branded PRiVACE – a portmanteau of private and place – is used to offer reserved-seat services.

== Design ==
The 2300 series trains use double-skinned aluminium body construction and are manufactured by Hitachi. They incorporate several styling cues synonymous with Hankyu, including the operator's maroon and ivory livery, wood grain veneers, and "golden olive"-coloured seats. The PRiVACE cars feature gold accents and running numbers.

Standard-class passenger accommodation consists of transverse seating with flip-over seat backs, with longitudinal seating at car ends. The longitudinal seats feature semi-translucent partitions.

PRiVACE accommodation consists of 2+1-abreast reclining seating throughout, with a seat pitch of 1,050 mm (41 in).

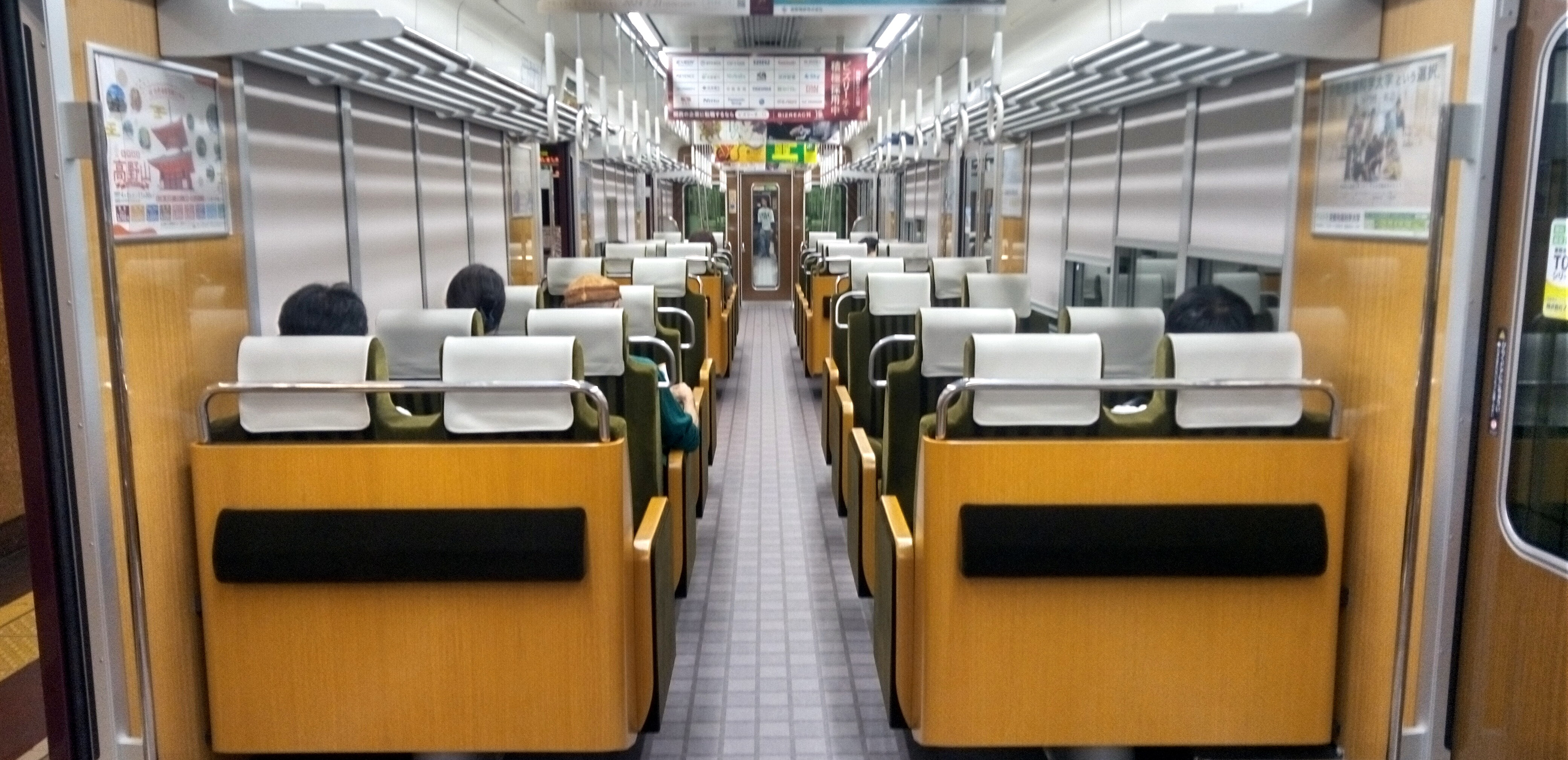
Interior

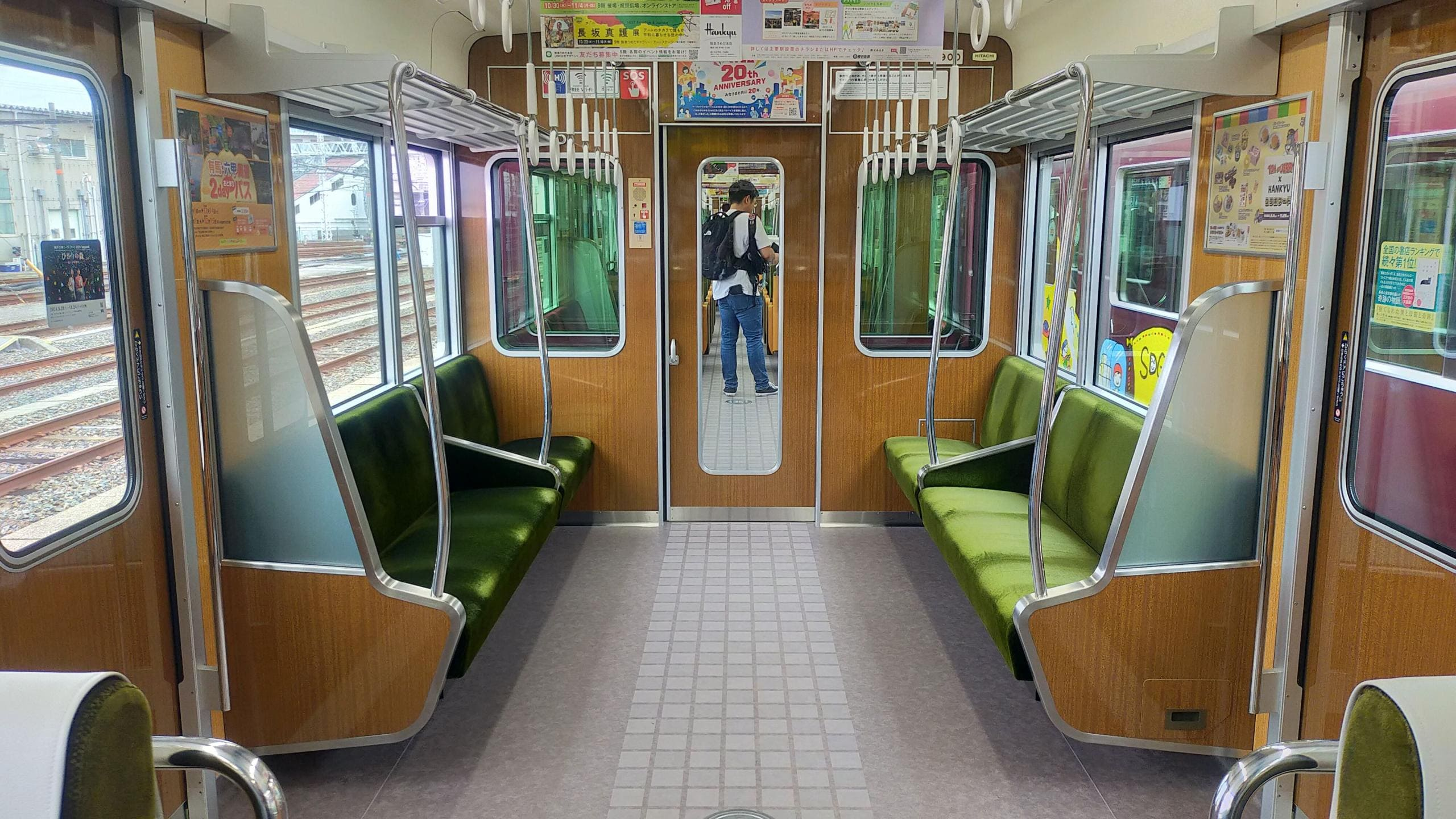
Longitudinal seating

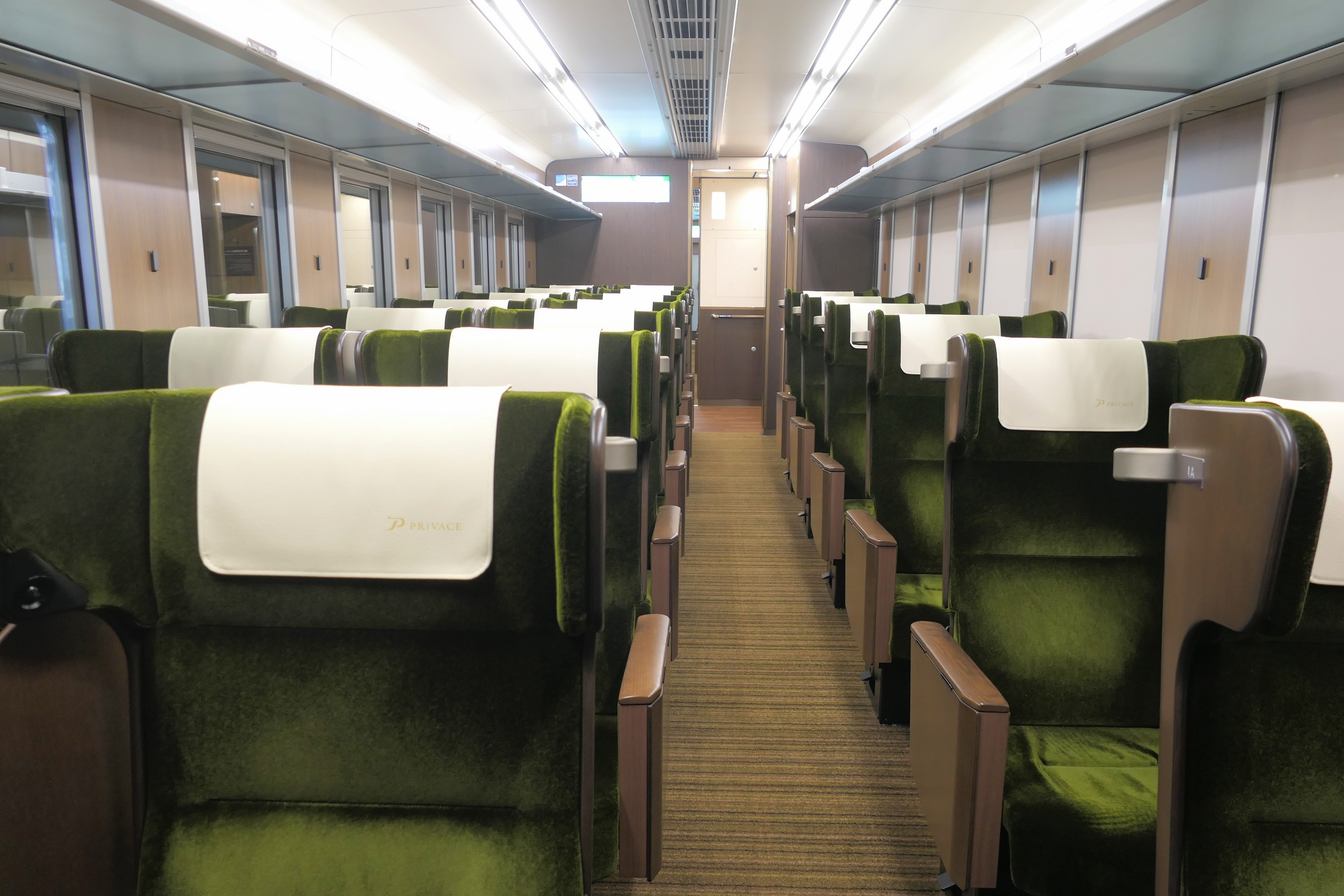
PRiVACE interior

== Formation ==
The 2300 series sets consist of four motored (M) cars and four trailer (T) cars. They are formed as shown below.

	← Osaka-umeda Kyoto-kawaramachi →							
Designation	2300 (Tc)	2800 (M)	2900 (M')	2350 (T)	2450 (T)	2850 (M)	2950 (M')	2400 (Tc)

The "M" cars are each equipped with two single-arm pantographs.

== History ==
Details of the 2300 series, alongside the 2000 series, were first announced by Hankyu Railway on 6 October 2023. A total of twelve 8-car sets are to be built.

The 2300 series fleet entered service from 21 July 2024, alongside the introduction of PRiVACE reserved-seat services. The first set introduced augments six 9300 series sets, which are each fitted with a new-build PRiVACE car. These cars will gradually be transferred to the 2300 series fleet as more sets are delivered. The new sets are also planned to displace the 9300 series to other services. As of 1 April 2025, three sets had been built.

In October 2024, the PRiVACE cars received the Good Design Award.
