= Japan Institute of Design Promotion =

Japanese design institution

The Japan Institute of Design Promotion (Japanese: 公益財団法人日本デザイン振興会) is a Japanese design institution. Originally called the Japan Industrial Design Promotion Organization, it was founded in 1969 with the goal of promoting industrial design. It issues annual Good Design Awards.
