= Hankyu 2300 series (1960) =

Japanese train type

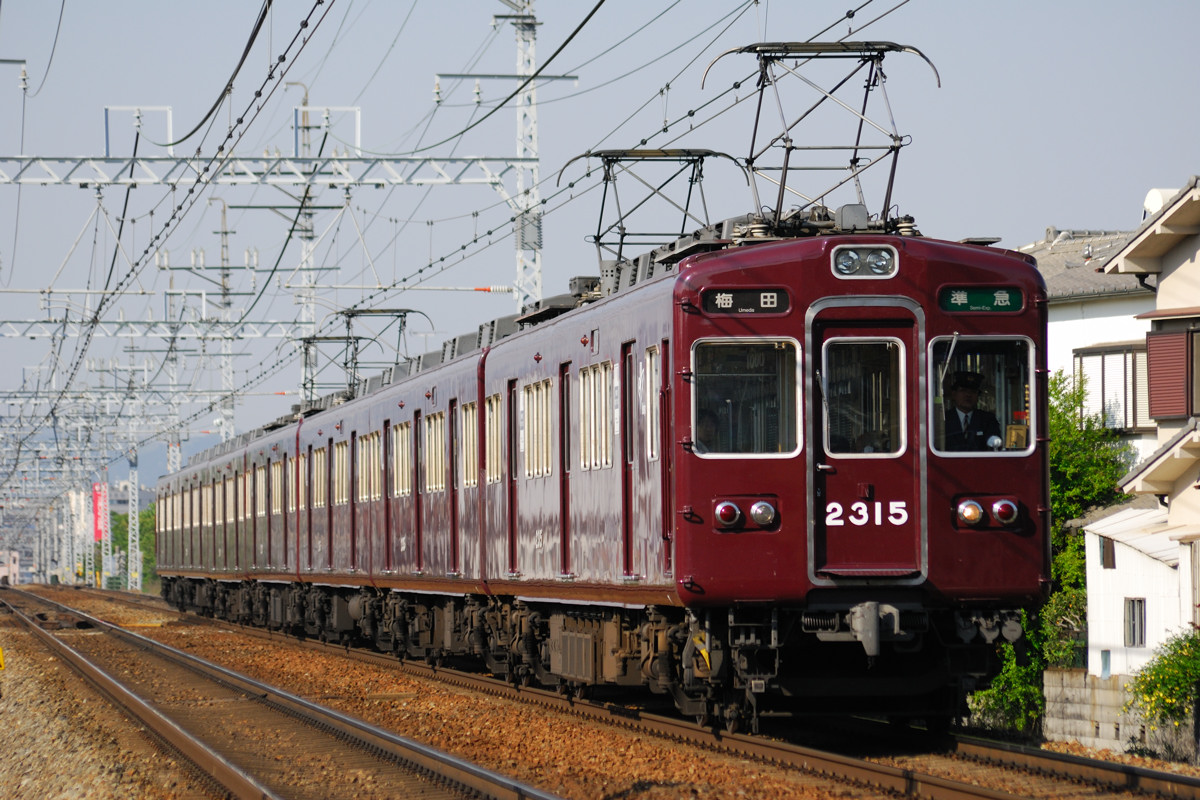
- A 2300 series on a Semi-express service, April 2007
- In service: 1960–2015
- Manufacturer: Naniwa Kōki
- Family name: Auto Car
- Number built: 78 vehicles
- Number in service: None
- Number preserved: 2 vehicles and 1 cab end
- Number scrapped: 75 vehicles
- Formation: 7 (formerly 2/3/4/5/6) cars per trainset
- Operators: Hankyu Railway
- Depots: Katsura
- Lines served: Hankyu Kyoto Main Line; Hankyu Senri Line

Specifications
- Car body construction: Steel
- Car length: 19,000 mm (62 ft 4 in)
- Width: 2,808 mm (9 ft 2.6 in)
- Height: 4,120 mm (13 ft 6 in)
- Doors: 3 pairs per side
- Maximum speed: 110 km/h (70 mph)
- Traction system: Resistor control (originally); Field chopper control Thyristor chopper control (2311/2331)
- Power output: 150 kW (200 hp) per motor
- Electric system(s): 600/1,500 V DC overhead catenary
- Current collector(s): Pantograph
- Braking system(s): Regenerative brake Electro-pneumatic brake
- Safety system(s): ATS
- Coupling system: Knuckle-Type
- Track gauge: 1,435 mm (4 ft 8 1/2 in)

The Hankyu 2300 series (阪急電鉄2300系) was an electric multiple unit (EMU) train type operated in Japan by the private railway operator Hankyu Railway from 1960 until March 2015.

== Formations ==
| Car No. | 1 | 2 | 3 | 4 | 5 | 6 | 7 |
|---|---|---|---|---|---|---|---|
| Designation | Mc | M' | To | Mo | M' | T | Tc |
| Numbering | 2300 | 2330 | 2350 | 2300 | 2330 | 2380 | 2350 |

- The "Mc" and "Mo" cars were each fitted with two lozenge-type pantographs.

== Interior ==
Passenger accommodation consisted of longitudinal bench seating throughout.

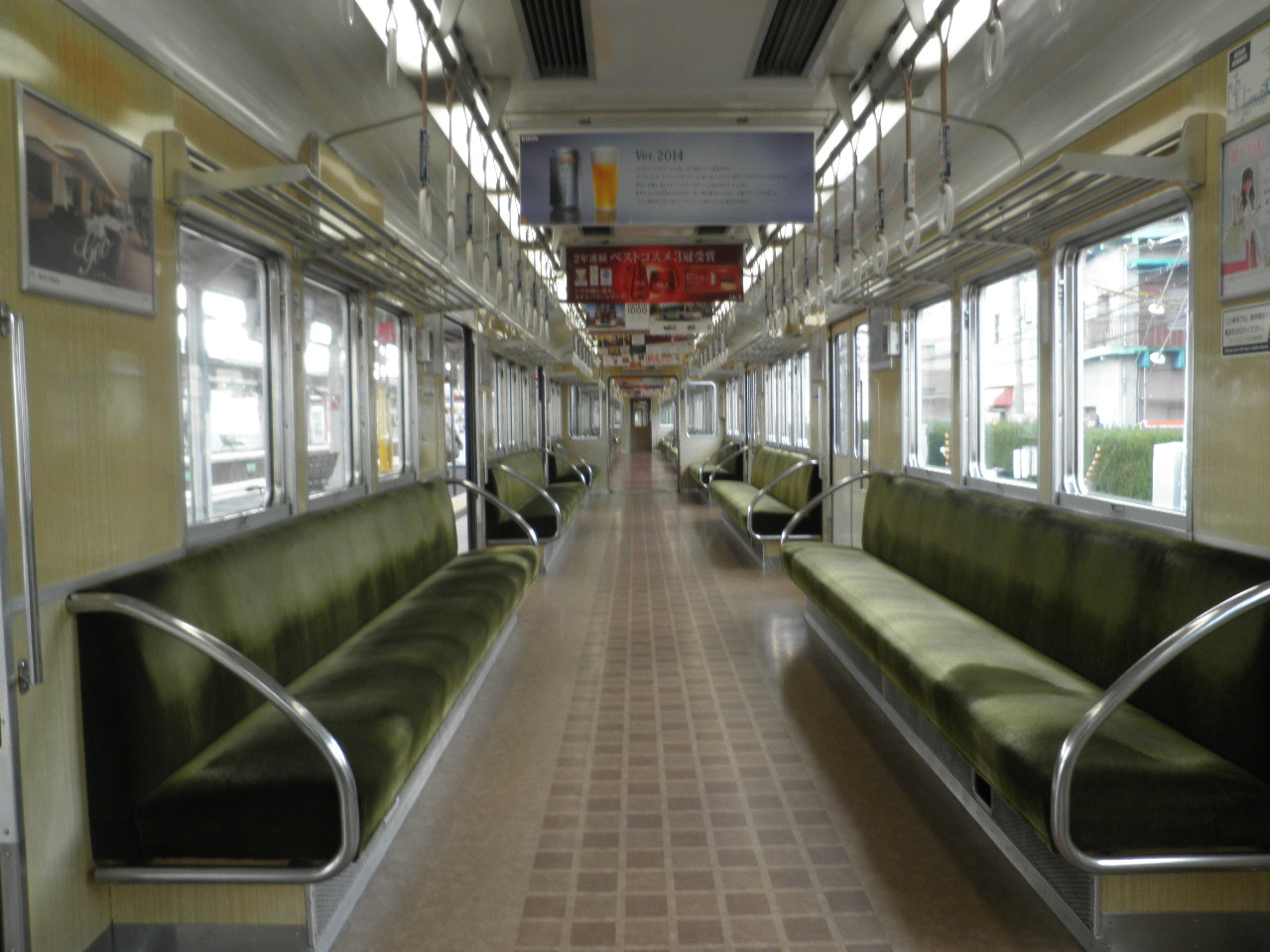
Interior

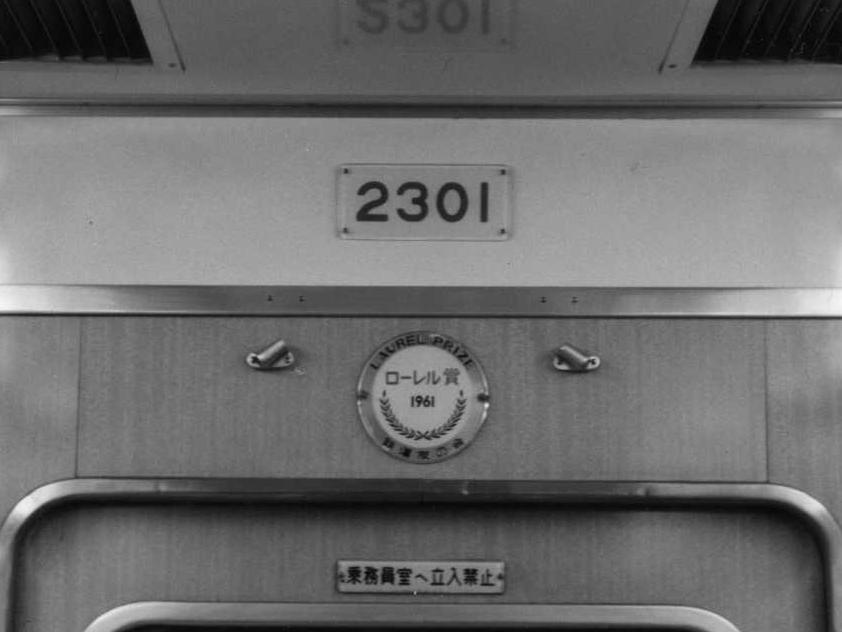
Laurel Prize Award plaque

== History ==
Construction of the trains began in 1960. The Hankyu 2300 series was the recipient of the inaugural Laurel Prize presented by the Japan Railfan Club in 1961. The final set in service operated until 20 March 2015.

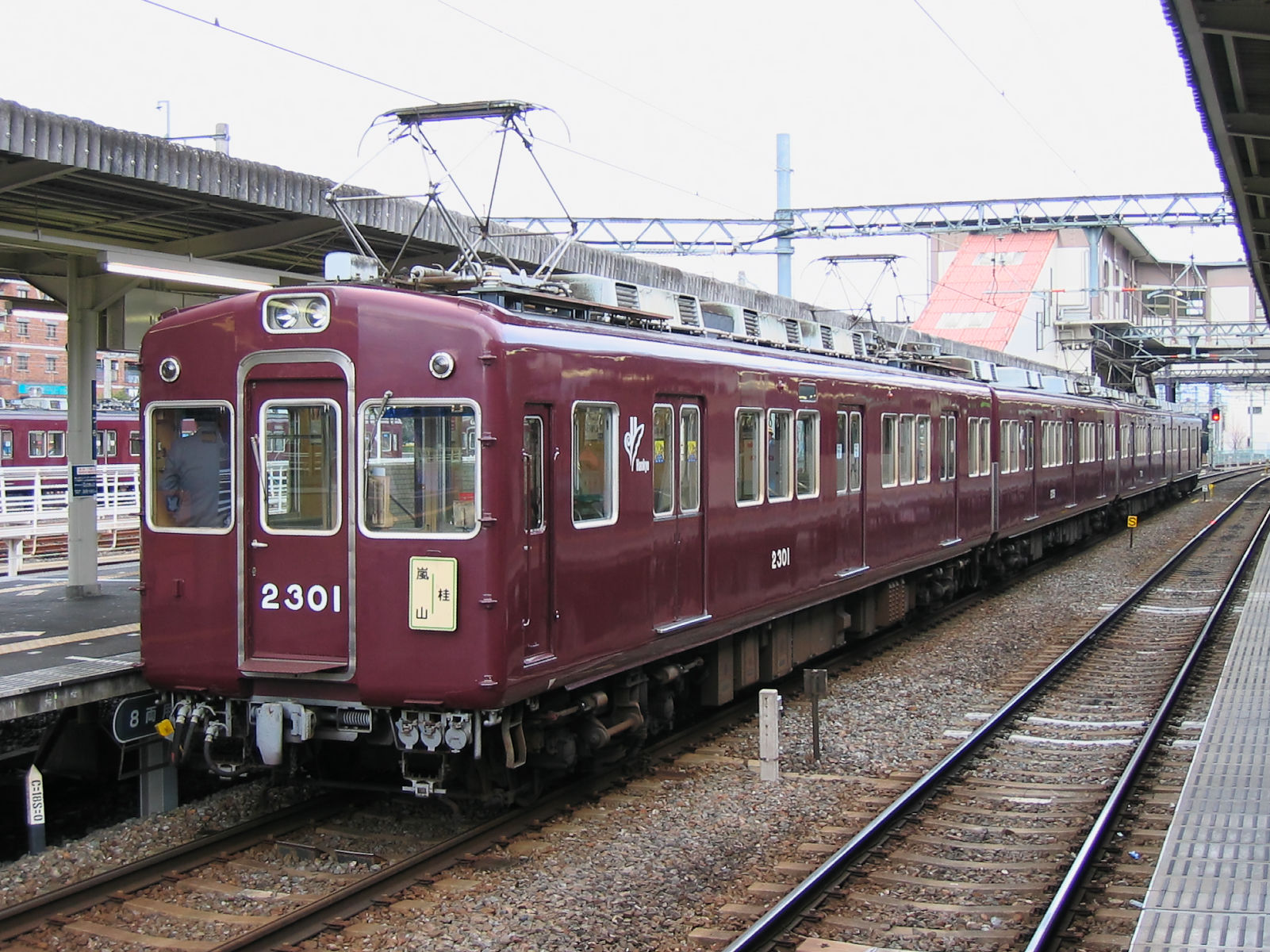
2300 series train in original style, March 2005

== Preserved examples ==
- 2301 + 2352: Shōjaku Depot, Osaka
- 2311 cab end: Privately preserved in Sanda, Hyōgo.
