= Good Design Award (Japan) =

Japanese design award

Good design award

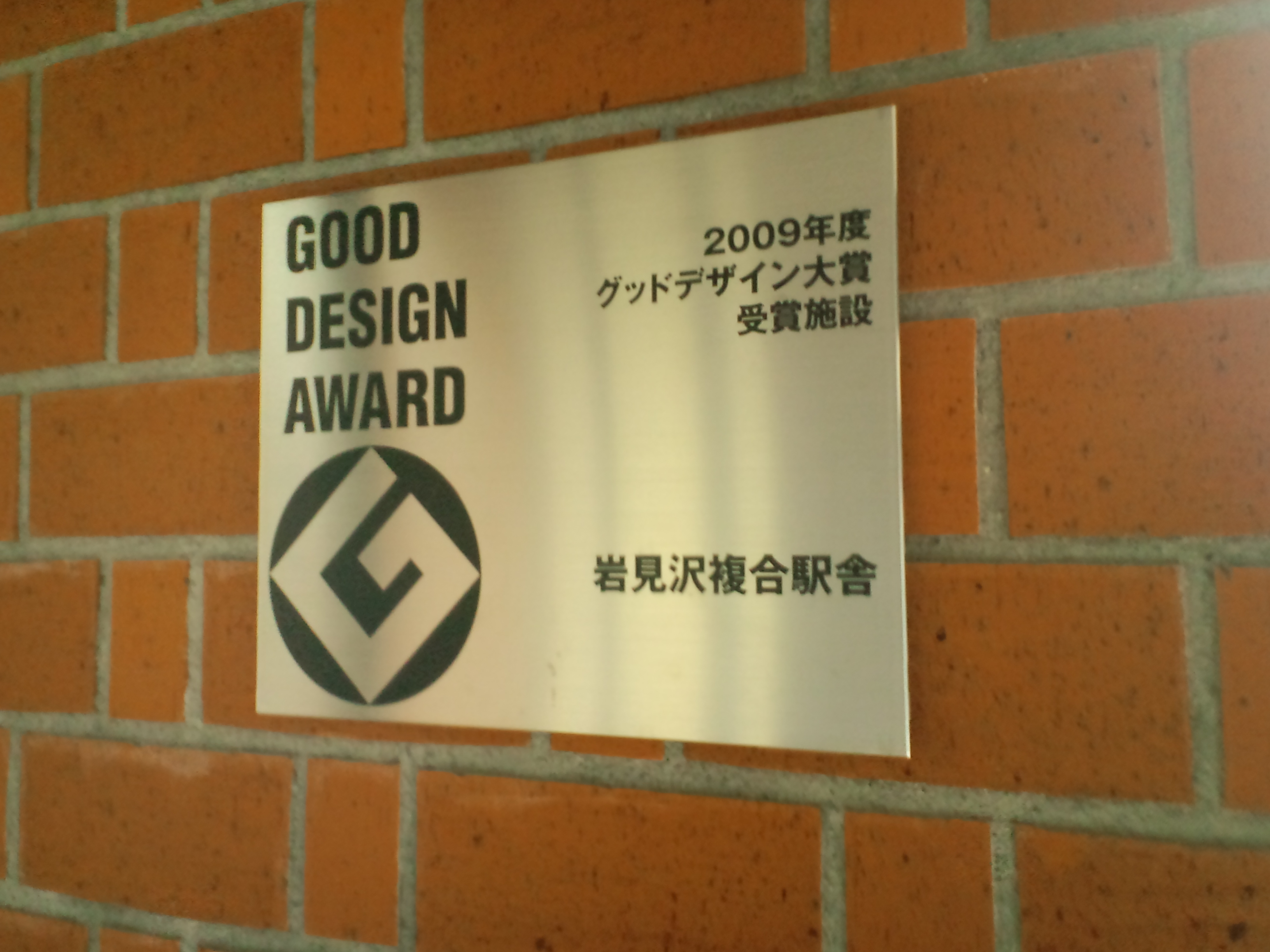
Iwamizawa-sta good-design-award memorial-plate

The Good Design Award (Japanese: グッドデザイン賞) is an award sponsored by the Japan Institute of Design Promotion, which is given to things with excellent design every year. It is the only comprehensive evaluation and recommendation system of design in Japan. According to the overseeing body, the "G-Mark Selection System was established in 1957".

The Chicago Athenaeum also sponsors an annual Good Design Award, which is unrelated to the Japanese award.

== See also ==
- List of design awards
